= 1949 =

1949 in various calendars
- Gregorian calendar: 1949; MCMXLIX
- Ab urbe condita: 2702
- Armenian calendar: 1398; ԹՎ ՌՅՂԸ
- Assyrian calendar: 6699
- Baháʼí calendar: 105–106
- Balinese saka calendar: 1870–1871
- Bengali calendar: 1355–1356
- Berber calendar: 2899
- British Regnal year: 13 Geo. 6 – 14 Geo. 6
- Buddhist calendar: 2493
- Burmese calendar: 1311
- Byzantine calendar: 7457–7458
- Chinese calendar: 戊子年 (Earth Rat); 4646 or 4439 — to — 己丑年 (Earth Ox); 4647 or 4440
- Coptic calendar: 1665–1666
- Discordian calendar: 3115
- Ethiopian calendar: 1941–1942
- Hebrew calendar: 5709–5710
- Hindu calendars
- Vikram Samvat: 2005–2006
- Shaka Samvat: 1870–1871
- Kali Yuga: 5049–5050
- Holocene calendar: 11949
- Igbo calendar: 949–950
- Iranian calendar: 1327–1328
- Islamic calendar: 1368–1369
- Japanese calendar: Shōwa 24 (昭和２４年)
- Javanese calendar: 1880–1881
- Juche calendar: 38
- Julian calendar: Gregorian minus 13 days
- Korean calendar: 4282
- Minguo calendar: ROC 38 民國38年
- Nanakshahi calendar: 481
- Thai solar calendar: 2492
- Tibetan calendar: ས་ཕོ་བྱི་བ་ལོ་ (male Earth-Rat); 2075 or 1694 or 922 — to — ས་མོ་གླང་ལོ་ (female Earth-Ox); 2076 or 1695 or 923

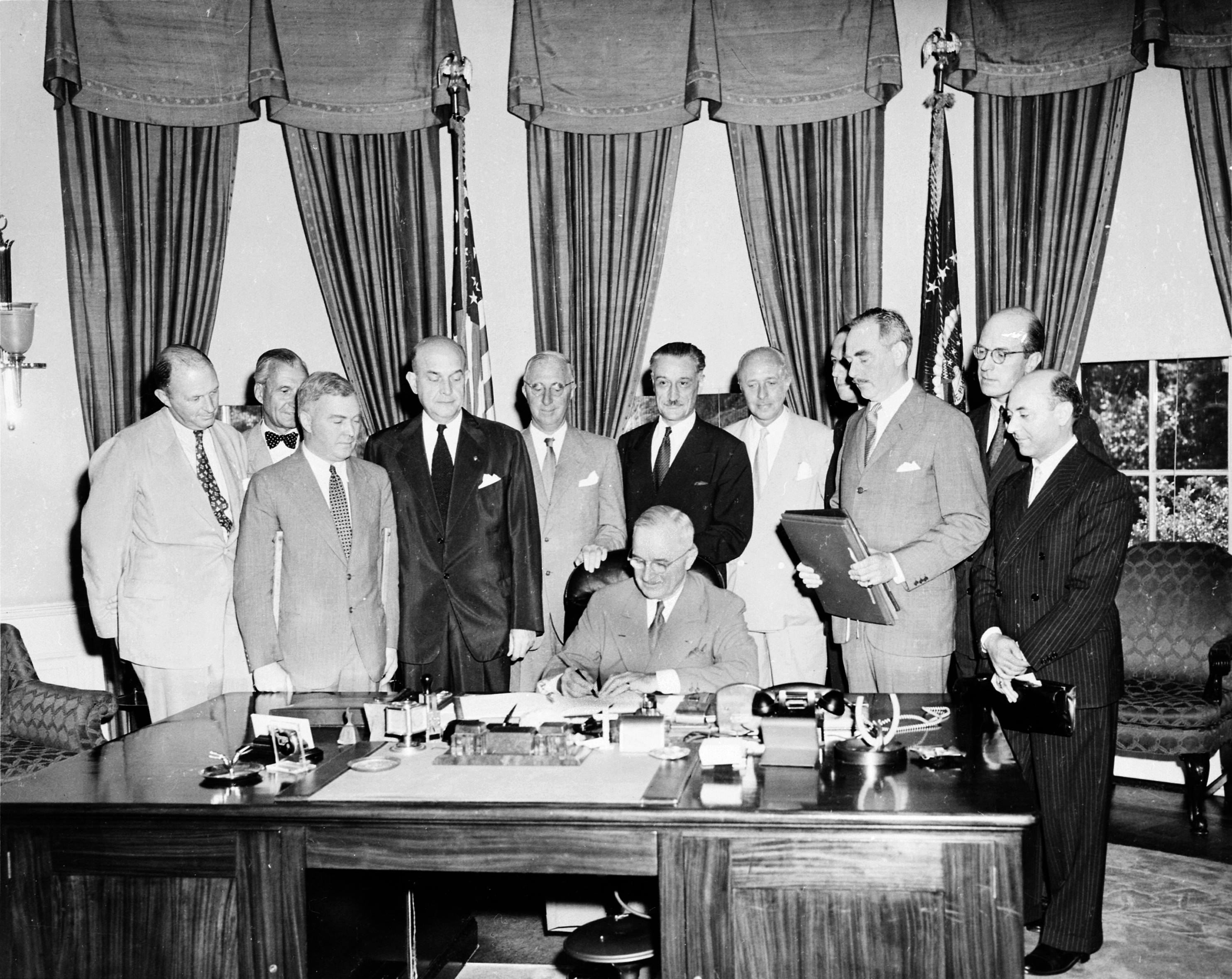
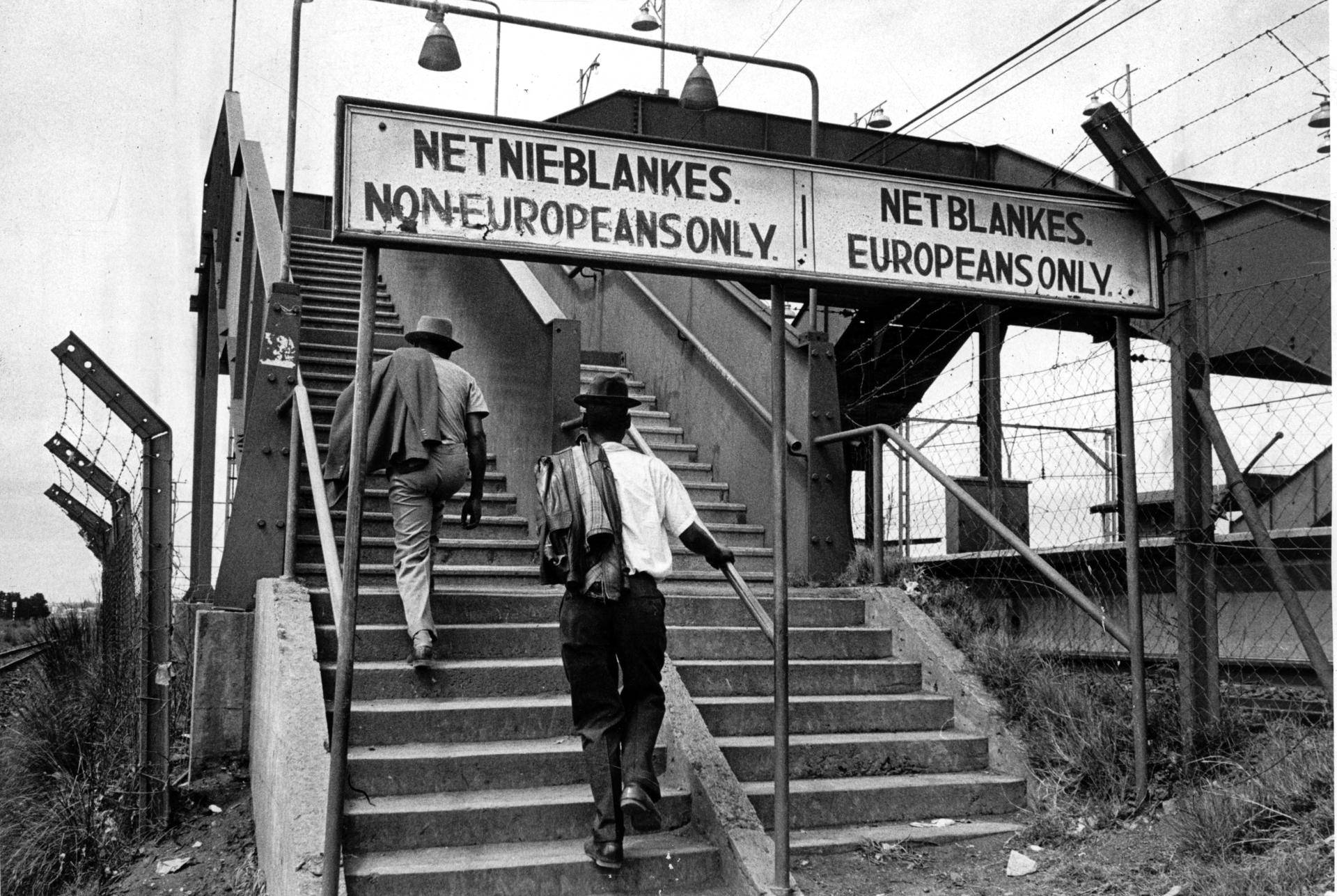
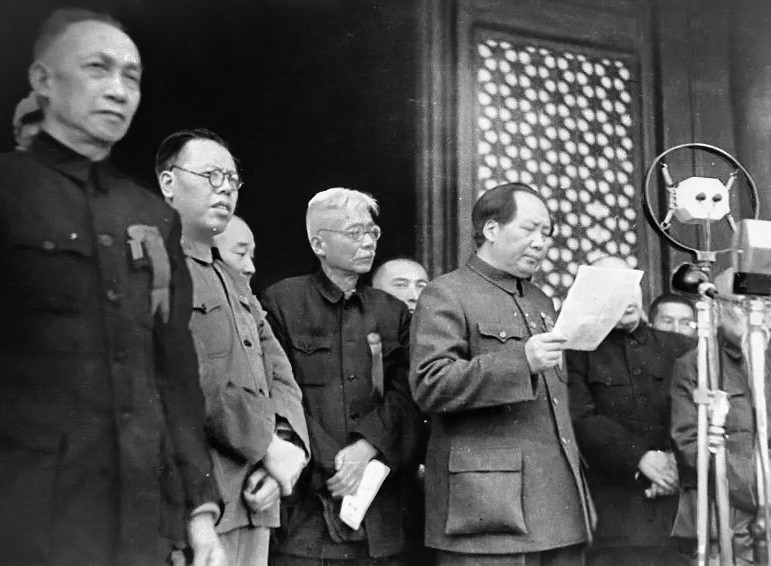
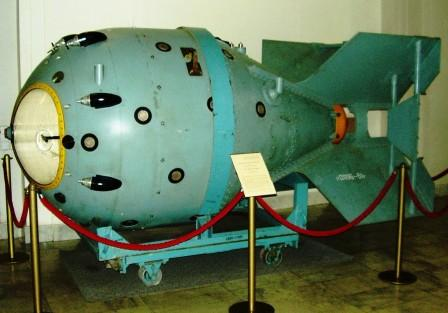
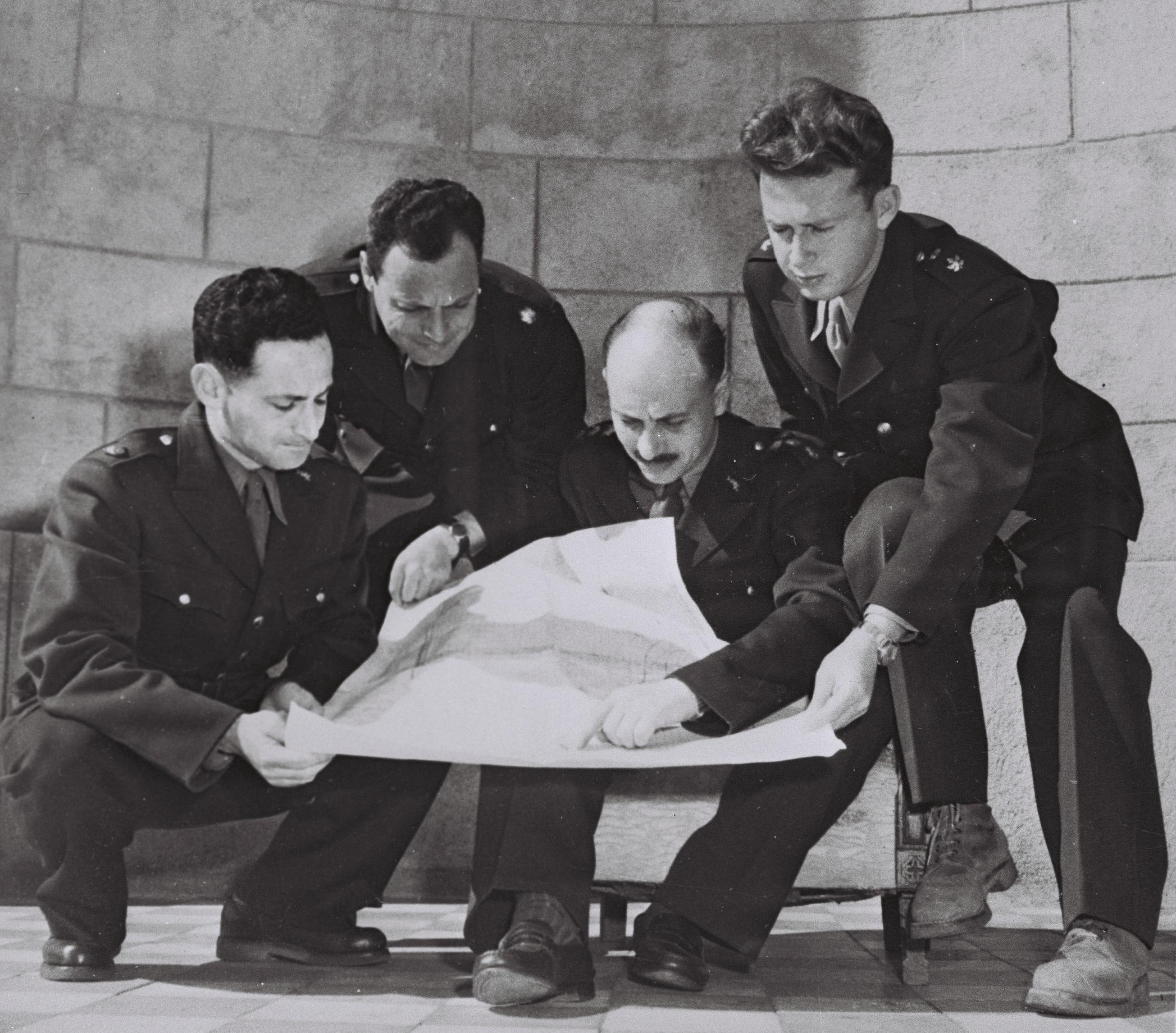
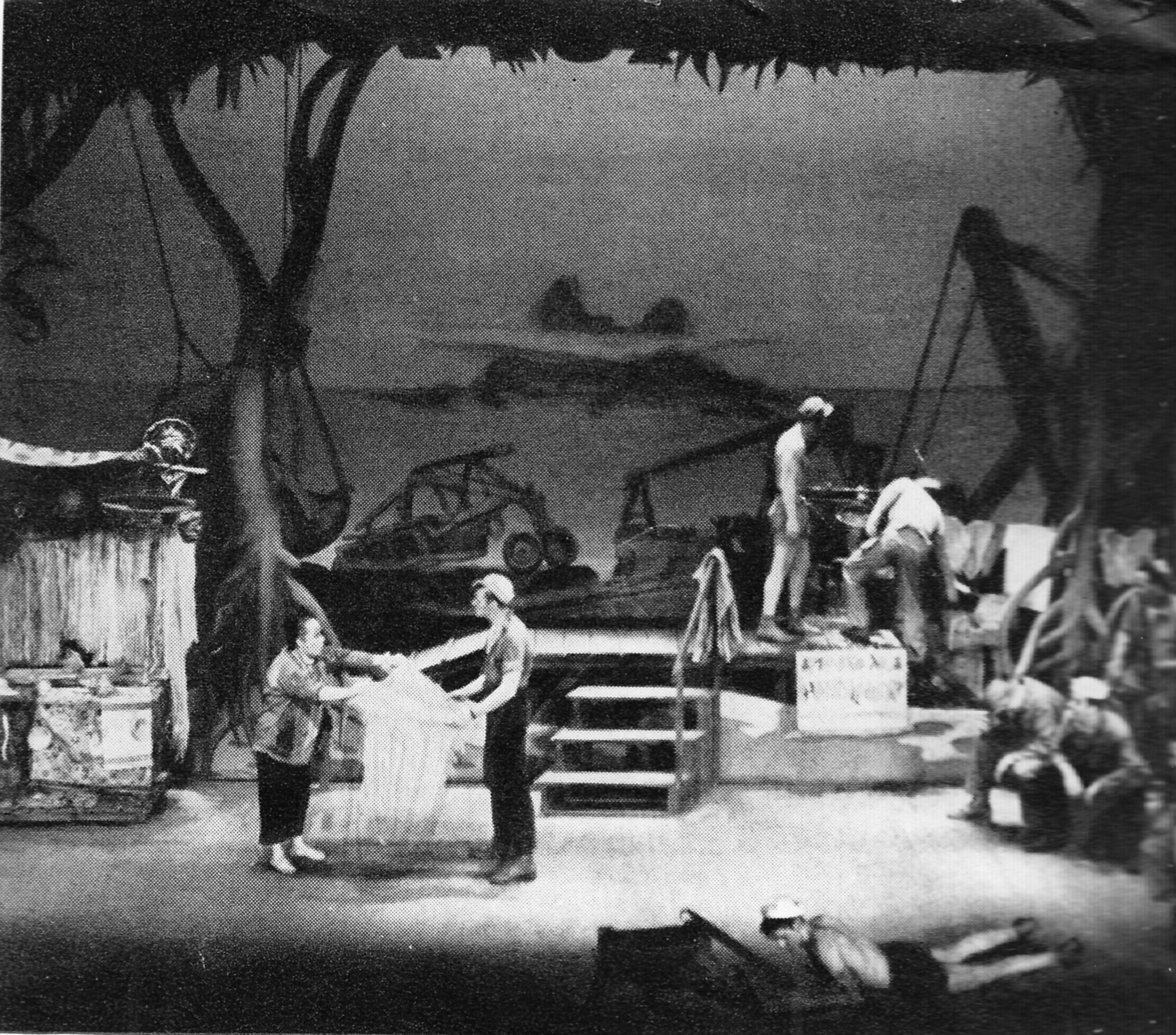
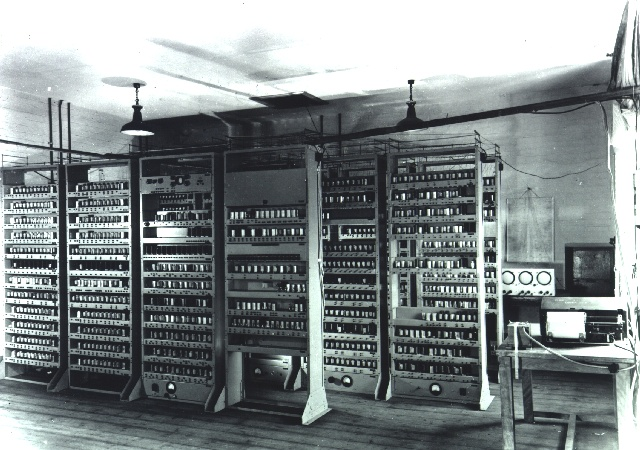
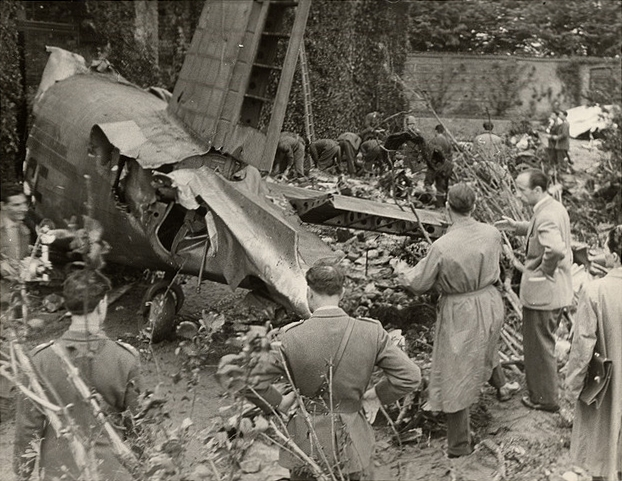
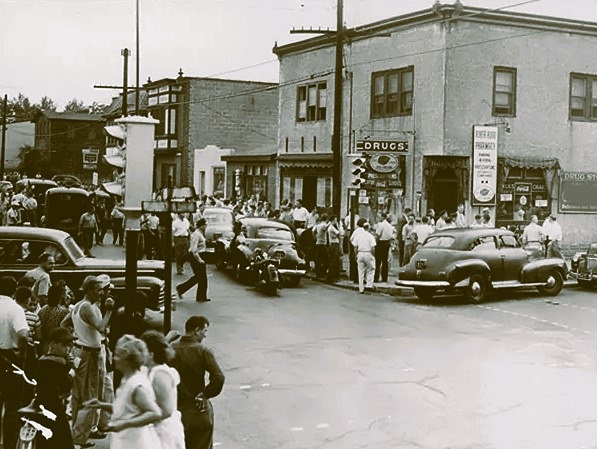
From top to bottom, left to right:
- The North Atlantic Treaty is signed in Washington, D.C., creating NATO as a Western defense alliance;
- Apartheid is formally instituted in South Africa, enforcing racial segregation;
- Mao Zedong proclaims the People's Republic of China, ending the Chinese Civil War and establishing communist rule;
- The Soviet Union detonates RDS-1, ending the United States’ nuclear monopoly;
- The 1949 Armistice Agreements end the 1948 Arab–Israeli War, setting new borders;
- The debut of South Pacific becomes a landmark in American theater and cultural history;
- The EDSAC runs its first program in Cambridge, advancing digital computing;
- The Superga air disaster kills the Torino F.C. team, shocking Italy;
- Howard Unruh commits a mass shooting in Camden, New Jersey, killing 13.

1949 (MCMXLIX) was a common year starting on Saturday of the Gregorian calendar, the 1949th year of the Common Era (CE) and Anno Domini (AD) designations, the 949th year of the 2nd millennium, the 49th year of the 20th century, and the 10th and last year of the 1940s decade.

== Events ==
=== January ===
- January 1 – A United Nations-sponsored ceasefire brings an end to the Indo-Pakistani War of 1947. The war results in a stalemate and the division of Kashmir, which still continues as of 2026
- January 2 – Luis Muñoz Marín becomes the first democratically elected Governor of Puerto Rico.
- January 11 – The first "networked" television broadcasts take place, as KDKA-TV in Pittsburgh, Pennsylvania, goes on the air, connecting east coast and mid-west programming in the United States.
- January 16 – Şemsettin Günaltay forms the new government of Turkey. It is the 18th government, last single party government of the Republican People's Party.

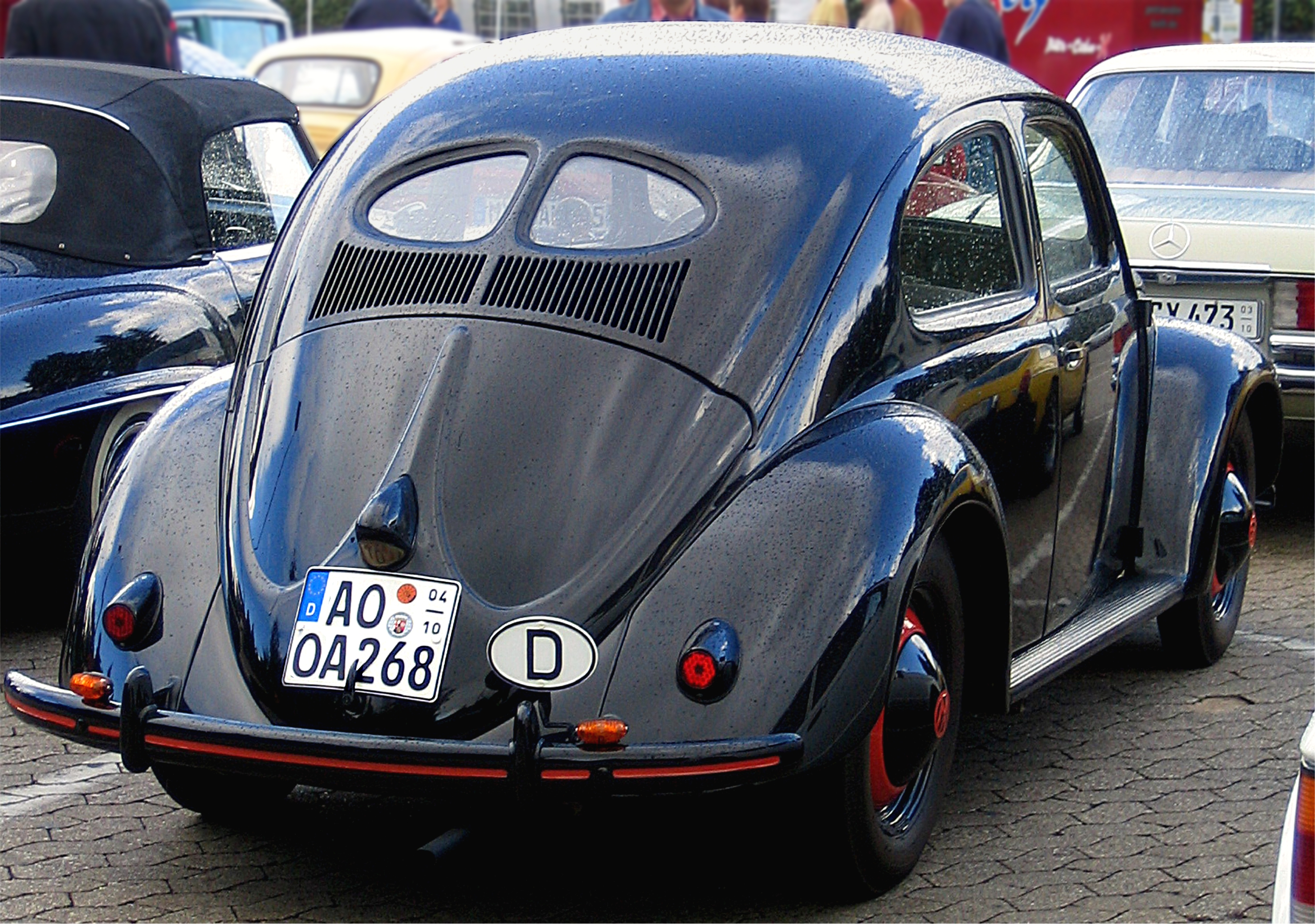
January 17: Beetle in U.S.

- January 17 – The first VW Type 1 to arrive in the United States, a 1948 model, is brought to New York by Dutch businessman Ben Pon. Unable to interest dealers or importers in the Volkswagen, Pon sells the sample car to pay his travel expenses. Only two 1949 models are sold in America that year, convincing Volkswagen chairman Heinrich Nordhoff the car has no future in the U.S. (The Type 1 goes on to become an automotive phenomenon.)
- January 25
  - The Council for Mutual Economic Assistance (CMEA or COMECON) is established by the Soviet Union and other communist nations.
  - In the first Israeli elections, David Ben-Gurion becomes Prime Minister.
- January 26 – Australian citizenship comes into being.
- c. January 28 – Stalin and antisemitism: The media in the Soviet Union resume a propaganda campaign against "rootless cosmopolitans", a euphemism for Soviet Jews, accusing them of being pro-Western and antisocialist.
- January 31 – Forces from the Chinese Communist Party enter Beijing.

=== February ===
- February 13 – António Óscar Carmona is re-elected president of Portugal, for lack of an opposing candidate.
- February 17 – Chaim Weizmann begins his term as the first president of Israel.
- February 26 – The Revolutionary Communist Party of India stages attacks at Dum Dum.

=== March ===
- March 1 – Indonesia seizes Yogyakarta from the Dutch.
- March 2 – The B-50 Superfortress Lucky Lady II (under Captain James Gallagher) lands in Fort Worth, Texas, United States, after completing the first non-stop around-the-world airplane flight (it was refueled in flight 4 times).
- March 20 – The Chicago, Burlington and Quincy, Denver and Rio Grande Western and Western Pacific railroads inaugurate the California Zephyr passenger train between Chicago and Oakland, California, as the first long-distance train to feature Vistadome cars as regular equipment.
- March 24 – The 21st Academy Awards Ceremony is held. The movie Hamlet wins the Academy Award for Best Picture.
- March 25
  - Operation Priboi: An extensive deportation campaign begins in Estonia, Latvia and Lithuania. The Soviet authorities deport more than 92,000 people from the Baltic states to remote areas of the Soviet Union.
  - First issue of weekly magazine Paris Match published in France.
- March 26 – The first half of Giuseppe Verdi's opera Aida, conducted by legendary conductor Arturo Toscanini, and performed in concert (i.e. no scenery or costumes), is telecast by NBC, live from Studio 8H at Rockefeller Center. The second half is telecast a week later. This is the only complete opera that Toscanini ever conducts on television.
- March 28
  - United States Secretary of Defense James Forrestal resigns suddenly.
  - English astronomer Fred Hoyle coins the term Big Bang (although describing the model as "unsatisfactory") during a BBC Third Programme radio broadcast.
- March 30
  - A military coup in Syria ousts President Shukri al-Quwatli.
  - An anti-NATO riot in Iceland takes place, prompted by the decision of the Icelandic parliament to join the newly formed NATO.
- March 31 – The former British colony of Newfoundland joins Canada, as its 10th province.

=== April ===
- April 4 – The North Atlantic Treaty is signed in Washington, D.C., creating the NATO defense alliance.
- April 7 – Rodgers and Hammerstein's South Pacific, starring Mary Martin and Ezio Pinza, opens on Broadway, and goes on to become Rodgers and Hammerstein's second longest-running musical. It becomes an instant classic of the musical theatre. The score's biggest hit is the song "Some Enchanted Evening".
- April 14 – The N'Ko alphabet is completed by Solomana Kante.
- April 18 – The Republic of Ireland formally becomes a republic, and leaves the British Commonwealth.
- April 20 – Royal Navy frigate HMS Amethyst goes up the Yangtze River, to evacuate British Commonwealth refugees escaping the advance of Mao's Communist forces. Under heavy fire, she grounds off Rose Island. After an abortive rescue attempt on April 26, she anchors 10 miles (16 km) upstream. Negotiations with the Communists to let the ship leave drag on for weeks, during which time the ship's cat Simon raises the crew's morale.
- April 23 – Chinese Communist troops take Nanjing.
- April 26 – Transjordan changes its name to the Hashemite Kingdom of Jordan.
- April 28
  - The 1949 Commonwealth Prime Ministers' Conference issues the London Declaration, enabling India (and, thereafter, any other nation) to remain in the Commonwealth despite becoming a republic, creating the position of 'Head of the Commonwealth' (held by the ruling British monarch), and renaming the organization, from the 'British Commonwealth' to the 'Commonwealth of Nations'.
  - Former First Lady of the Philippines Aurora Quezon, 61, is assassinated while en route to dedicate a hospital in memory of her late husband; her daughter and 10 others are also killed.

=== May ===
- May 1 – Nereid, a moon of Neptune, is discovered by Gerard Kuiper.
- May 4 – Superga air disaster: A Fiat G.212 airliner of Avio Linee Italiane, carrying the entire Torino F.C. football team, crashes into the back wall of the Basilica of Superga, killing all 31 on board.
- May 5 – The Council of Europe is founded, by the signing of the Treaty of London.
- May 6 – EDSAC, the first practicable stored-program computer, runs its first program at Cambridge University.
- May 9 – Rainier III becomes Prince of Monaco, upon the death of his maternal grandfather Louis II.
- May 11
  - Israel is admitted to the United Nations, as its 59th member.
  - Siam officially changes its French name to "Thaïlande" (English name to "Thailand"), having officially changed its Thai name to "Prated Thai" since 1939.
- May 12 – Cold War: The Soviet Union lifts the Berlin Blockade.
- May 16 – The Tokyo Stock Exchange resumes operations, after a four-year shutdown.
- May 20
  - The AFSA (predecessor of the NSA) is established.
  - The Kuomintang regime declares martial law in Taiwan, which lasts until 1987.
- May 22 – After two months in Bethesda Naval Hospital, James Forrestal commits suicide under suspicious circumstances.
- May 23 – The Federal Republic of Germany (West Germany) is officially established (until 1990).
- May 31 – The first trial of Alger Hiss for perjury begins in New York City, with Whittaker Chambers as principal witness for the prosecution.

=== June ===
- June 5 – Thailand elects Orapin Chaiyakan, the first Thai female member of Thailand's Parliament.
- June 6 – With the passage of the Bodh Gaya Temple Act by the Indian government, Mahabodhi Temple is restored to partial Buddhist control.
- June 7–25 – Dock workers strike in the United Kingdom.
- June 8
  - Second Red Scare in the United States: Celebrities including Helen Keller, Dorothy Parker, Danny Kaye, Fredric March, John Garfield, Paul Muni and Edward G. Robinson are named as Communist Party members in a Federal Bureau of Investigation report.
  - George Orwell's dystopian novel Nineteen Eighty-Four is published in London.
- June 14 – Albert II, a rhesus monkey aboard U.S. Hermes project V-2 rocket Blossom IVB, becomes the first primate to enter space. He is killed on impact at return.
- June 19 – Glenn Dunaway wins the inaugural NASCAR Cup Series race at Charlotte Speedway, a 3/4 mile oval in Charlotte, North Carolina, but is disqualified due to illegal springs. Jim Roper is declared the official winner.
- June 24 – The first television western, Hopalong Cassidy, airs on NBC in the United States.
- June 29 – Apartheid: The South African Citizenship Act suspends the granting of citizenship to Commonwealth of Nations immigrants after 5 years, and imposes a ban on mixed marriages.

=== July ===
- July 1 – The Institute of Chartered Accountants of India is established.
- July 11 – Pamir is the last commercial sailing ship to round Cape Horn, under sail alone.
- July 12 – 1949 Bombay KLM Constellation crash
- July 15 – In an explosion at Prüm in Germany, the town is badly damaged and 12 people die. The explosion crater is one of the largest ever recorded.
- July 20 – Israel and Syria sign a truce to end their 19-month war.
- July 24 (St John's Day) – Eruption of the Cumbre Vieja volcano on La Palma begins.
- July 27
  - The de Havilland Comet, the world's first jet-powered airliner, makes its first flight, in England.
  - Rhodesia beats the New Zealand national rugby union team (the All Blacks) 10–8, in an exhibition match in Bulawayo, the only non-Test nation ever to achieve this feat.
- July 30 – Legal aid is introduced in England and Wales.
- July 31 – Captain Kerans of HMS Amethyst decides to make a break after nightfall, under heavy fire from the Chinese People's Liberation Army on both sides of the Yangtze River, and successfully rejoins the fleet at Woosung the next day.

=== August ===
- August 3 – The Basketball Association of America and the National Basketball League finalize the merger that will create the National Basketball Association.
- August 5 – In Ecuador, the 6.8 M_{L} Ambato earthquake kills more than 5,000, and destroys a number of villages.
- August 8 – Bhutan signs a Treaty of Friendship with newly independent India, agreeing non-interference in internal affairs, but allowing India to "guide" its foreign policy (similar to the previous arrangements with the British administration in India).
- August 10 – the Avro Canada C102 Jetliner makes its first flight; it is the first jet airliner to fly in North America.
- August 12 – The Fourth Geneva Convention is agreed to.
- August 14
  - The Salvatore Giuliano Gang explodes mines under a police barracks, outside Palermo, Sicily.
- August 18 – Kemi Bloody Thursday: two protesters die in the scuffle between the police and the strikers' protest procession in Kemi, Finland.
- August 21
  - The Vatican announces that bones uncovered in its catacombs could be those of the apostle Peter; 19 years later, Pope Paul VI announces confirmation that the bones belong to this first pope.
  - Deportivo Saprissa enters Costa Rican soccer's first division.
  - The 1949 Queen Charlotte Islands earthquake is Canada's largest earthquake since the 1700 Cascadia earthquake.
- August 24 – The North Atlantic Treaty Organization is established.
- August 29
  - The Council of Europe meets for the first time.
  - The Soviet Union tests its first atomic bomb, RDS-1 ("Joe 1"). Its design imitates the American plutonium bomb that was dropped on Nagasaki, Japan, in 1945.
- August 31
  - The retreat of the Democratic Army of Greece to Albania, after its defeat at Mount Gramos, marks the end of the Greek Civil War.
  - Six of the last sixteen surviving veterans of the Union Army, in the American Civil War, meet in Indianapolis.

=== September ===
- September 2 – Film noir The Third Man, with screenplay by Graham Greene and set in Allied-occupied Vienna, is released in the United Kingdom; it wins the 1949 Grand Prix at the Cannes Film Festival.
- September 6
  - Howard Unruh, a World War II veteran, kills 13 neighbors in Camden, New Jersey with a souvenir Parabellum P.08 pistol, to become America's first single-episode mass murderer.
  - Allied military authorities relinquish control of former Nazi Germany assets back to Germany.
- September 7 – The first Bundestag of the Federal Republic of Germany convenes in Bonn. They will elect Konrad Adenauer as Chancellor while the Federal Convention, a constitutional body consisting of the Bundestag members and a same number of representatives of the States, elect the liberal Theodor Heuss as President of Germany on 12 September.
- September 9
  - Albert Guay affair: A dynamite bomb destroys Canadian Pacific Airlines Douglas DC-3, in Quebec.
  - Notorious World War II veteran Edwin Alonzo Boyd commits his first career bank robbery, in Toronto.
- September 13 – The Soviet Union vetoes United Nations membership for Ceylon, Finland, Iceland, Italy, Jordan and Portugal.
- September 17
  - Canadian steamship SS Noronic burns in Toronto Harbour, with the loss of over 118 lives.
  - Warner Bros. cartoon, "Fast and Furry-ous" is released. It also marks the debut of Wile E. Coyote and the Road Runner. The director is Chuck Jones (credited as Charles M. Jones).
- September 19 – The United Kingdom government devalues the pound sterling from $4.03 to $2.80, leading to many other currencies being devalued.
- September 23 – U.S. president Harry S. Truman announces that the Soviet Union has tested the atomic bomb.
- September 24 – László Rajk, ex-foreign minister of Hungary, is sentenced to death.
- September 25 – U.S. Christian evangelist Billy Graham starts his Los Angeles Crusade, his first great evangelistic campaign. It runs for eight weeks during which Graham speaks to 350,000 people and the event is subsequently described as the greatest revival since the time of Billy Sunday. After this, Graham becomes a national figure in the United States.
- September 29
  - The first plenary session of the Chinese People's Political Consultative Conference approves a design for the flag of the People's Republic of China.
  - Iva Toguri D'Aquino is found guilty in the United States of broadcasting for Japan as "Tokyo Rose" at the end of World War II.

=== October ===
October 1: People's Republic of China is founded.

October 7: The German Democratic Republic is Established.

- October 1 – The People's Republic of China is officially proclaimed.
- October 2 – The Soviet Union recognizes the People's Republic of China.
- October 3 – Albanian Subversion: First Anglo-American attempt to infiltrate guerillas into Albania; the operation is fatally flawed, by being under the control of double agent Kim Philby.
- October 6 – The Democratic People's Republic of Korea (North Korea) established its first diplomatic and friendly relations with newly proclaimed Communist China (PRC) between the two nations.
- October 7 – The German Democratic Republic (East Germany) is officially established (until 1990).
- October 13 – Severe flooding hits Guatemala.
- October 14 – The Foley Square trial of Eugene Dennis and ten other leaders of the Communist Party USA ends in New York City (the longest trial in U.S. history to this date); all defendants are found guilty and all but one sentenced to five years of prison.
- October 16 – Greek Civil War ends with a communist surrender.
- October 17 – Chinese communist troops take Guangzhou.
- October 20 – China People's Insurance Corporation, as predecessor of China Life was founded.
- October 24 – The cornerstone of the Headquarters of the United Nations on Manhattan is laid.
- October 27
  - Battle of Kuningtou: Chinese communist troops fail to take Quemoy; their advance towards Taiwan is halted.
  - 1949 Air France Lockheed Constellation crash: An Air France flight from Paris to New York crashes in the Azores on São Miguel Island, killing all aboard. Among the victims are violinist Ginette Neveu, and French boxer Marcel Cerdan.

=== November ===
- November 7 – Oil is discovered beneath the Caspian Sea, off the coast of the Azerbaijan Soviet Socialist Republic.
- November 12 – The Volkswagen Type 2 panel van is unveiled in Germany.
- November 15 – Nathuram Godse and Narayan Apte are executed for assassinating Mahatma Gandhi.
- November 17 – The second trial of Alger Hiss for perjury begins in New York, again with Whittaker Chambers as principal witness.
- November 24 – The ski resort in Squaw Valley, Placer County, California officially opens.
- November 26 – The Indian Constituent Assembly adopts India's constitution.
- November 28 – Winston Churchill makes a landmark speech in support of the idea of a European Union, at Kingsway Hall, London - but does not see UK as part of it, "The British Government have rightly stated that they cannot commit this country to entering any European Union without the agreement of the other members of the British Commonwealth".
- November 30 – 1949 New Zealand general election: The New Zealand National Party, led by Sidney Holland defeats the incumbent New Zealand Labour Party, led by Peter Fraser.

=== December ===
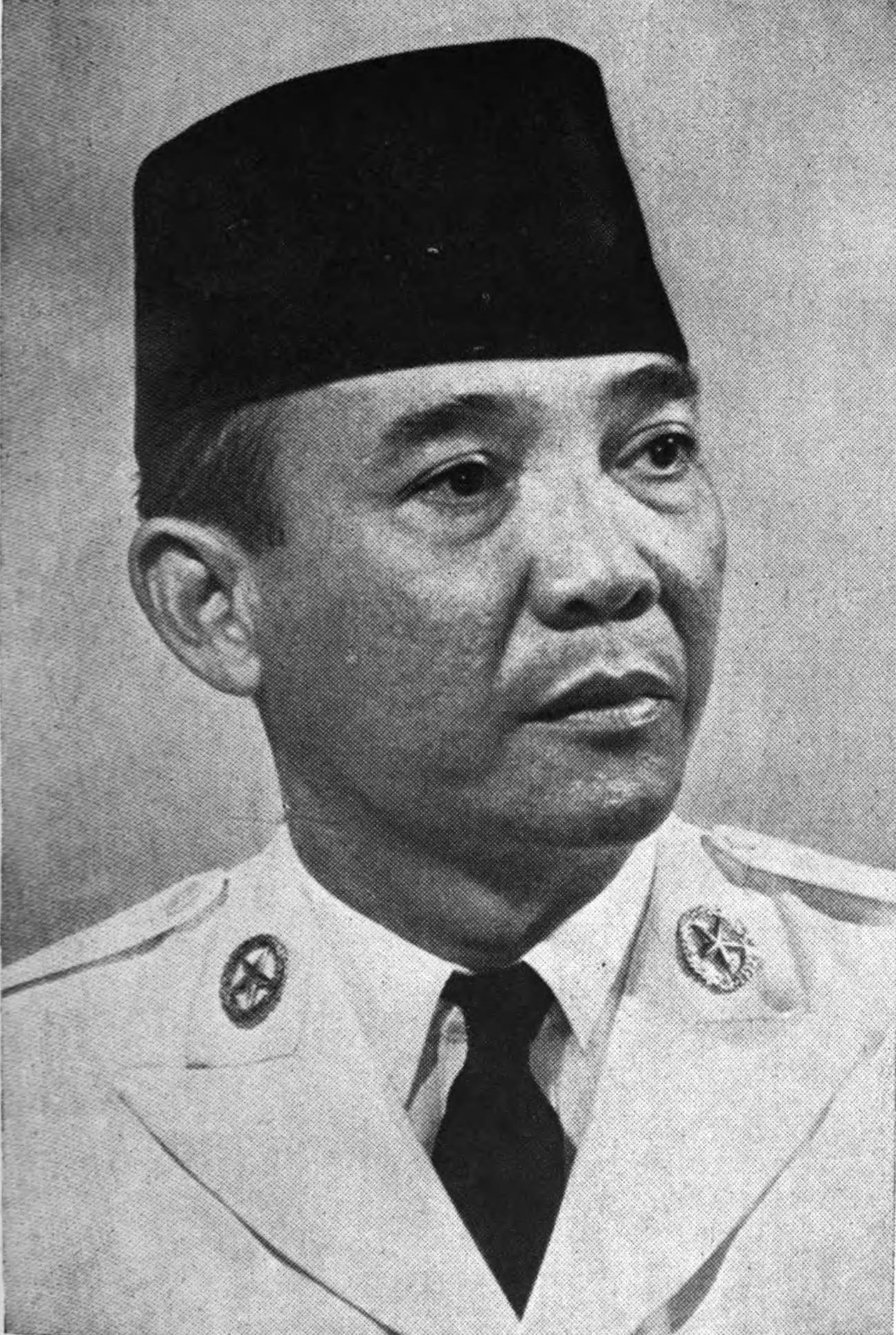
Dec. 16: Sukarno, first president of Indonesia

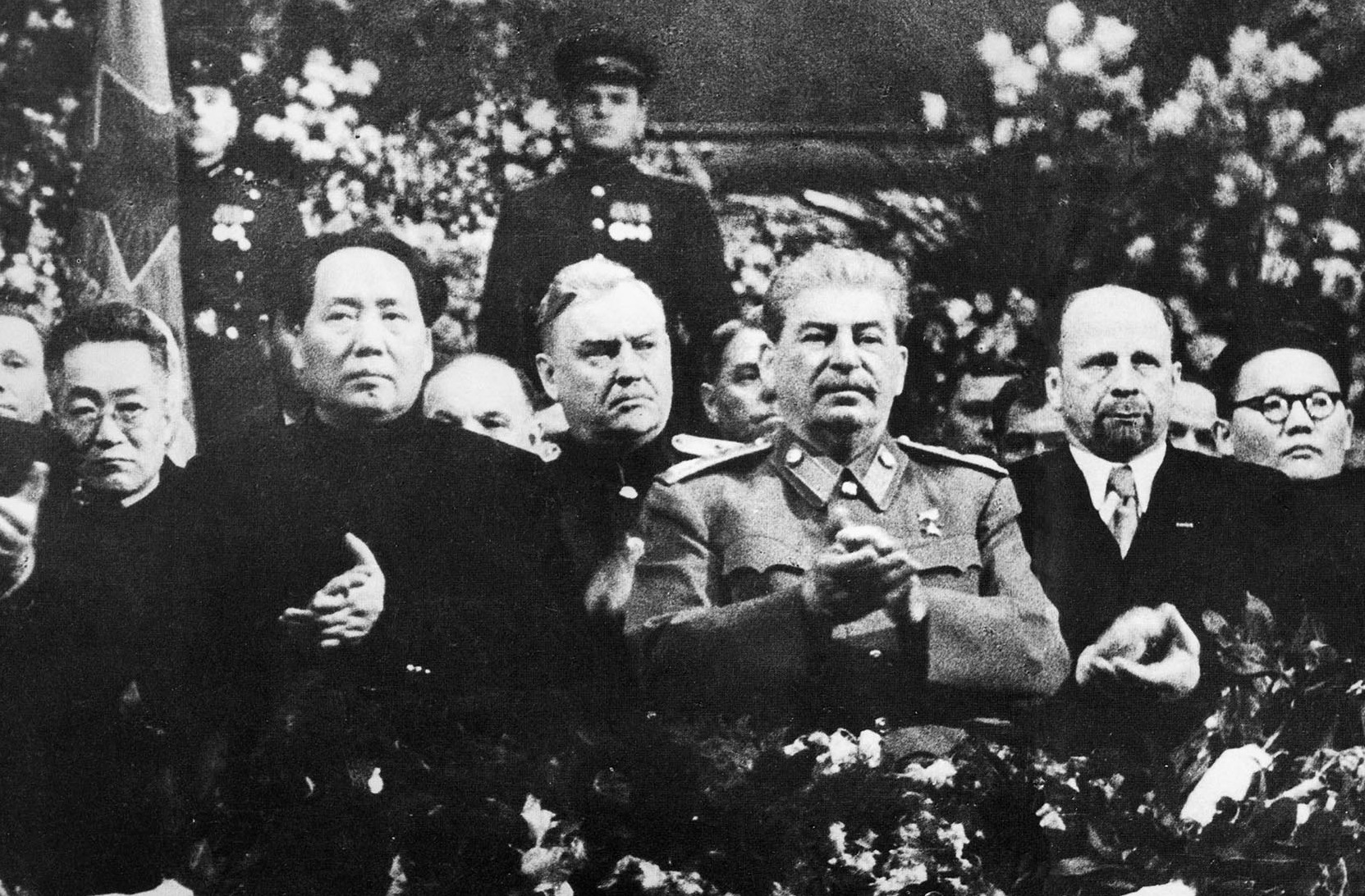
Celebration of Joseph Stalin's 70th Birthday (December 21, 1949)

- December 7
  - Retreat of the government of the Republic of China to Taiwan finishes, and it declares Taipei its temporary capital city, a status it will retain more than 50 years later.
  - The United Nations Relief and Works Agency for Palestine Refugees in the Near East (UNRWA) is established as a United Nations agency.
- December 10 – 1949 Australian federal election: The Liberal/Country Coalition led by Robert Menzies defeats the Labor government, led by Prime Minister Ben Chifley. Menzies is sworn in on December 19, his second stint as prime minister; he will hold the office for over 16 years until his retirement in 1966 and Labor will not win office again until 1972, under Gough Whitlam.
- December 13 – The Knesset votes to move the capital of Israel to Jerusalem.
- December 14 – Traicho Kostov, who until March was acting president of the Council of Ministers of Bulgaria, is sentenced to death for anti-Communist Party activity.
- December 15 – A typhoon strikes a fishing fleet off Korea, killing several thousand.
- December 16 – Sukarno is elected president of the Republic of Indonesia.
- December 17 – Burma recognises the People's Republic of China.
- December 18 – In the American National Football League, the Philadelphia Eagles defeat the Los Angeles Rams 14–0, to win the championship.
- December 21 – Soviet Leader Joseph Stalin's 70th Birthday is Held in Moscow.
- December 27 – The Treaty of The Hague ends the Indonesian National Revolution by recognizing transfer of the sovereignty of the Dutch East Indies from Queen Juliana of the Netherlands to the United States of Indonesia; the Susanto Cabinet takes office in the Republic of Indonesia.
- December 29
  - KC2XAK of Bridgeport, Connecticut, becomes the first Ultra high frequency (UHF) television station to operate a daily schedule.
  - Smouha SC (sports club) is founded in Alexandria, Egypt, by Joseph Smouha, a Mizrahi Iraqi Jew.
- December 30 – India recognizes the People's Republic of China.

=== Date unknown ===
- The Malta Labour Party is founded.
- D. R. Kaprekar discovers the convergence property of the number 6174.
- Slavery in Kuwait is abolished

== Births ==
=== January ===
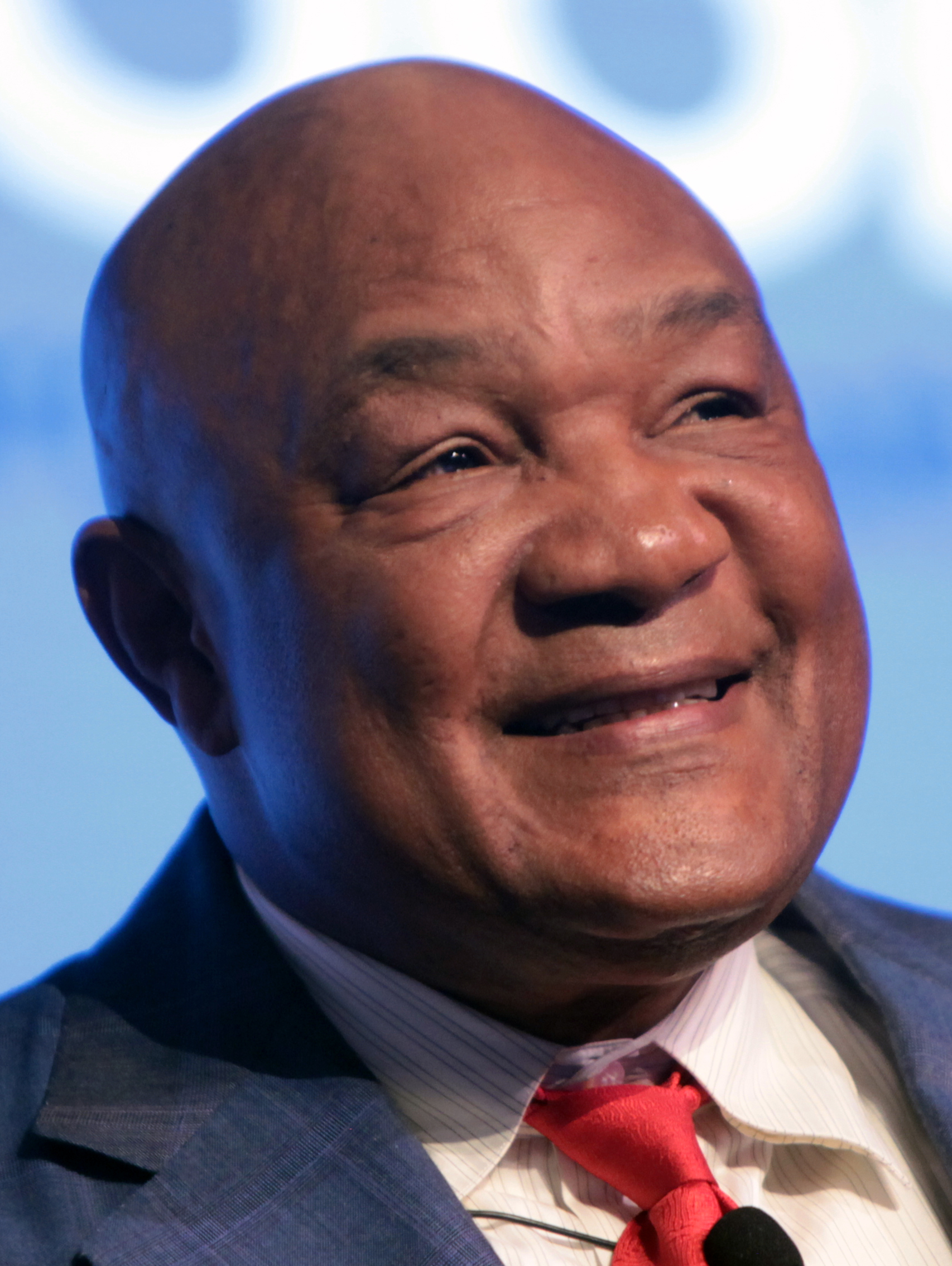
George Foreman

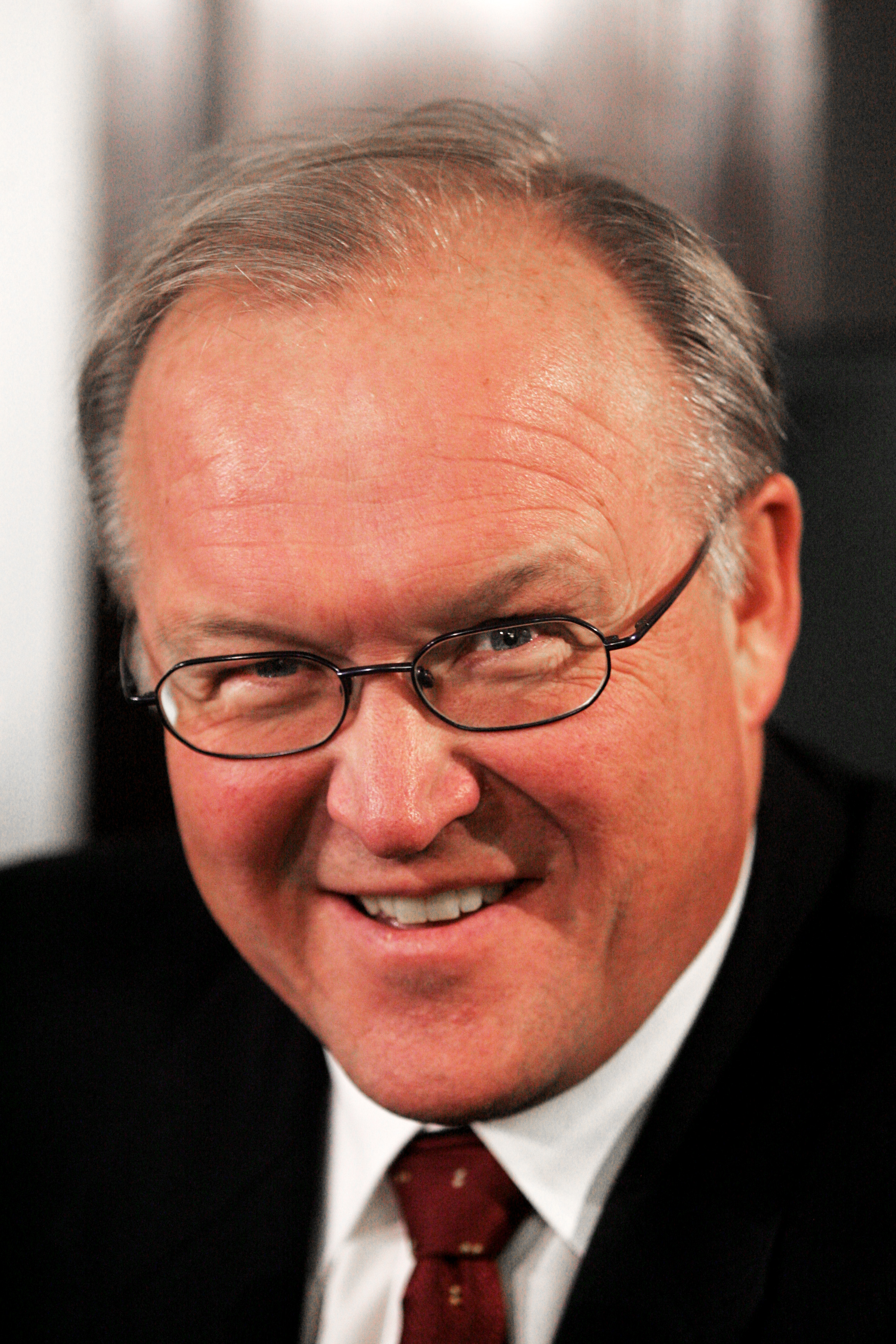
Göran Persson

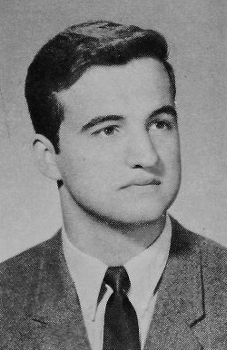
John Belushi

- January 2
  - Nikolai Pankin, Russian breaststroke swimmer, swimming coach (d. 2018)
  - Christopher Durang, American playwright (d. 2024)
- January 9 – Mary Roos, German singer
- January 10
  - George Foreman, African-American boxer (d. 2025)
  - Linda Lovelace, American porn actress, later anti-porn activist (d. 2002)
- January 12
  - Ottmar Hitzfeld, German football player, coach
  - Haruki Murakami, Japanese author
  - Wayne Wang, Hong Kong-born film director
- January 14 – Lawrence Kasdan, American director, screenwriter
- January 15 – Panos Mihalopoulos, Greek actor
- January 17
  - Gyude Bryant, Liberian politician (d. 2014)
  - Andy Kaufman, American comedian, actor (d. 1984)
  - Mick Taylor, English musician
- January 18 – Philippe Starck, French designer
- January 19
  - Robert Palmer, British rock singer (d. 2003)
  - Dennis Taylor, Irish snooker player
- January 20 – Göran Persson, 31st prime minister of Sweden
- January 21 – Trương Tấn Sang, 8th president of Vietnam
- January 22 – Steve Perry, American rock singer (Journey)
- January 23 – Siti Hardiyanti Rukmana, Indonesian politician and former minister of social affairs
- January 24 – John Belushi, American actor, comedian (Saturday Night Live) (d. 1982)
- January 25 – Paul Nurse, English geneticist, recipient of the Nobel Prize in Physiology or Medicine
- January 26 – David Strathairn, American actor (Good Night, and Good Luck)
- January 27 – Djavan, Brazilian singer, songwriter
- January 28 – Mike Moore, 34th prime minister of New Zealand (d. 2020)
- January 30 – Peter Agre, American biologist, recipient of the Nobel Prize in Chemistry
- January 31 – Johan Derksen, Dutch footballer, sports journalist

=== February ===
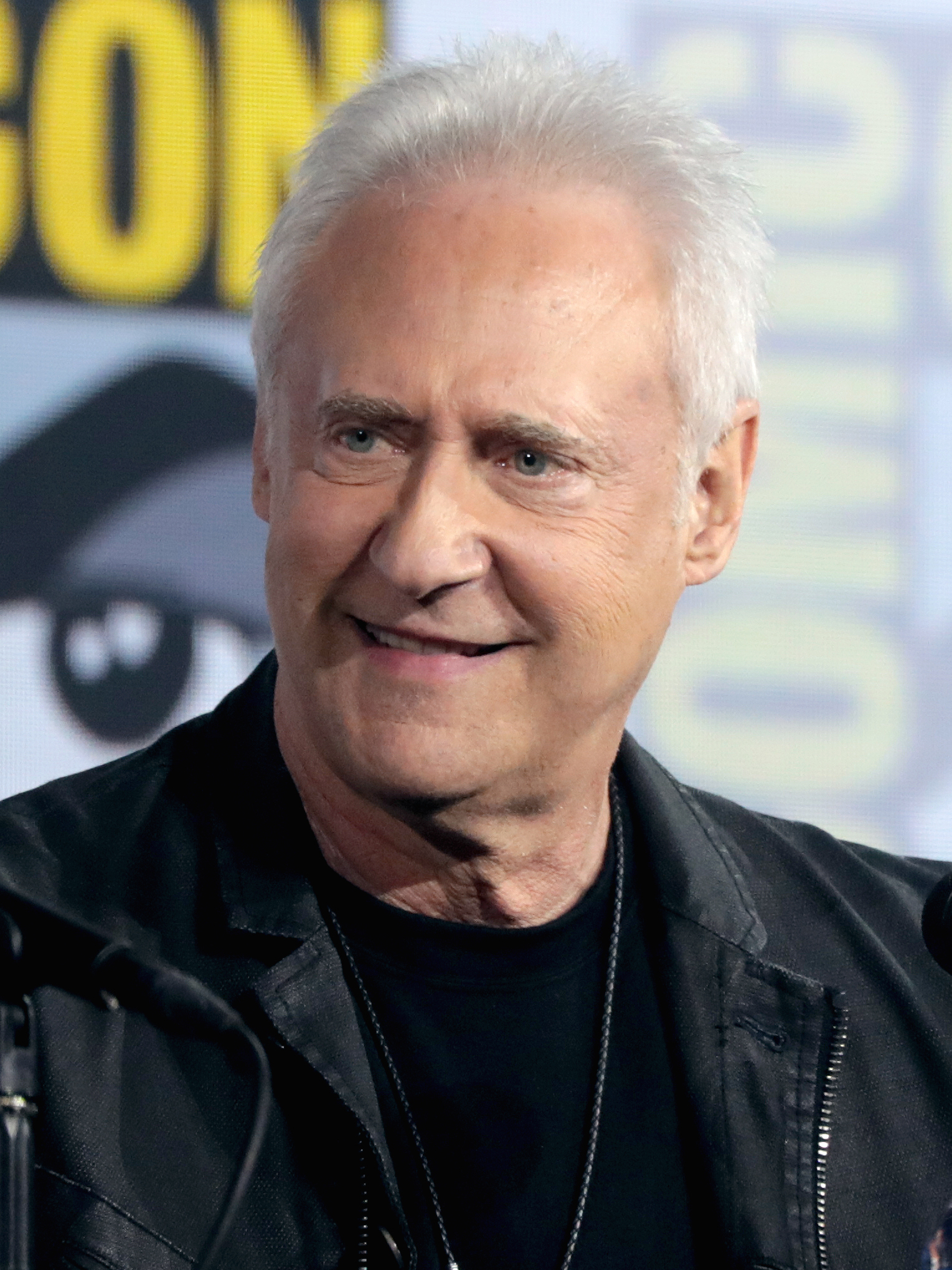
Brent Spiner

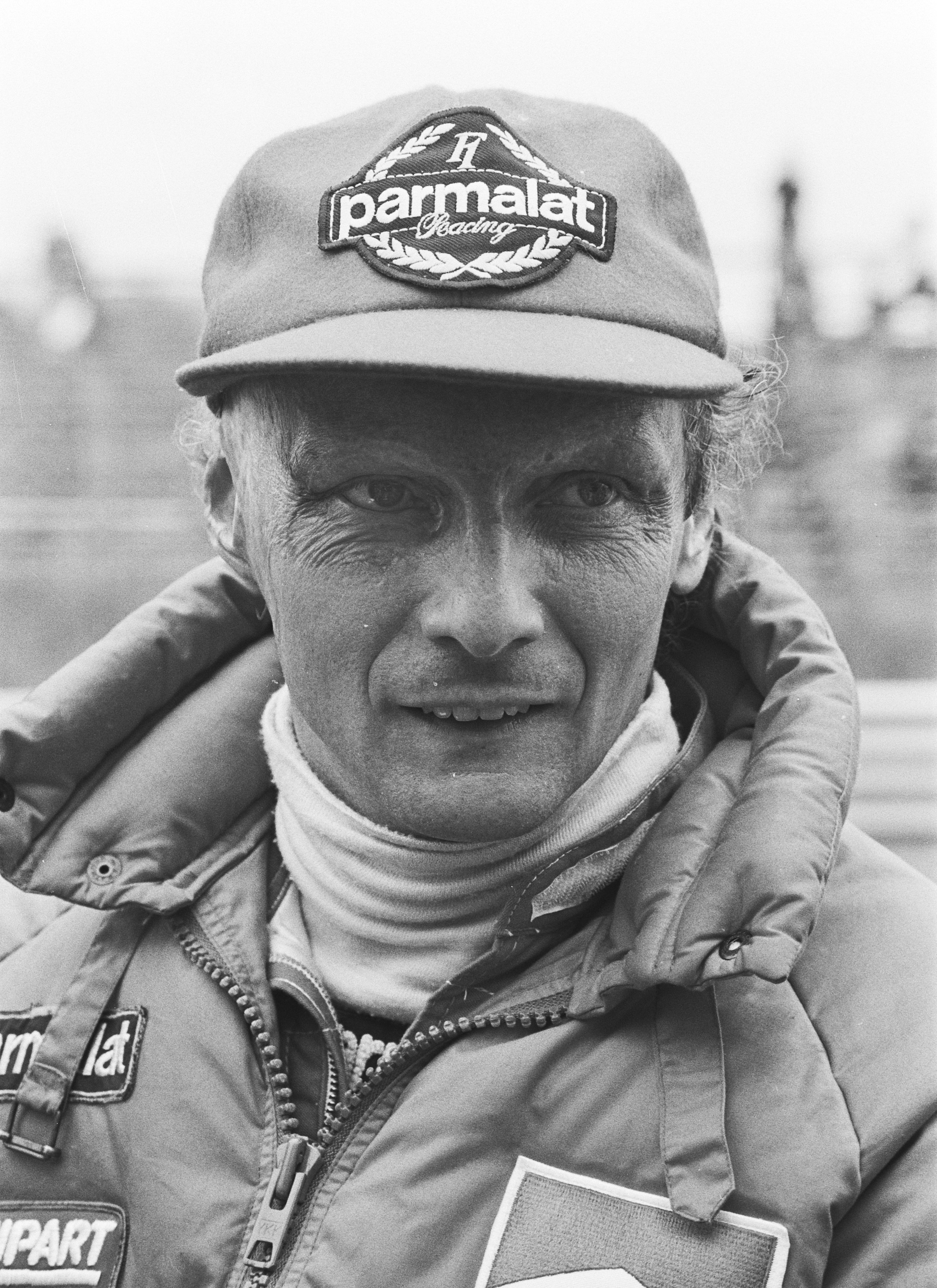
Niki Lauda

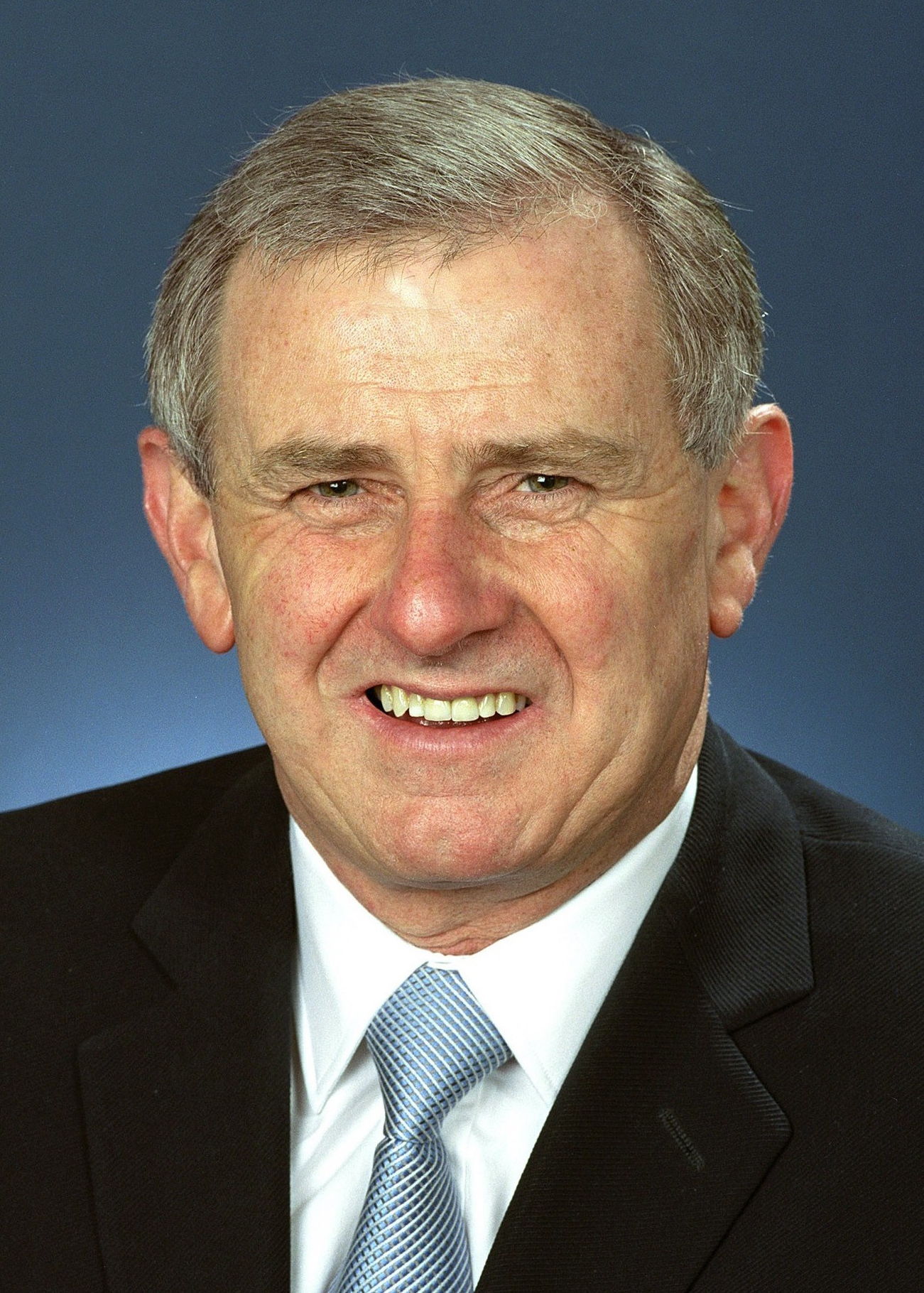
Simon Crean

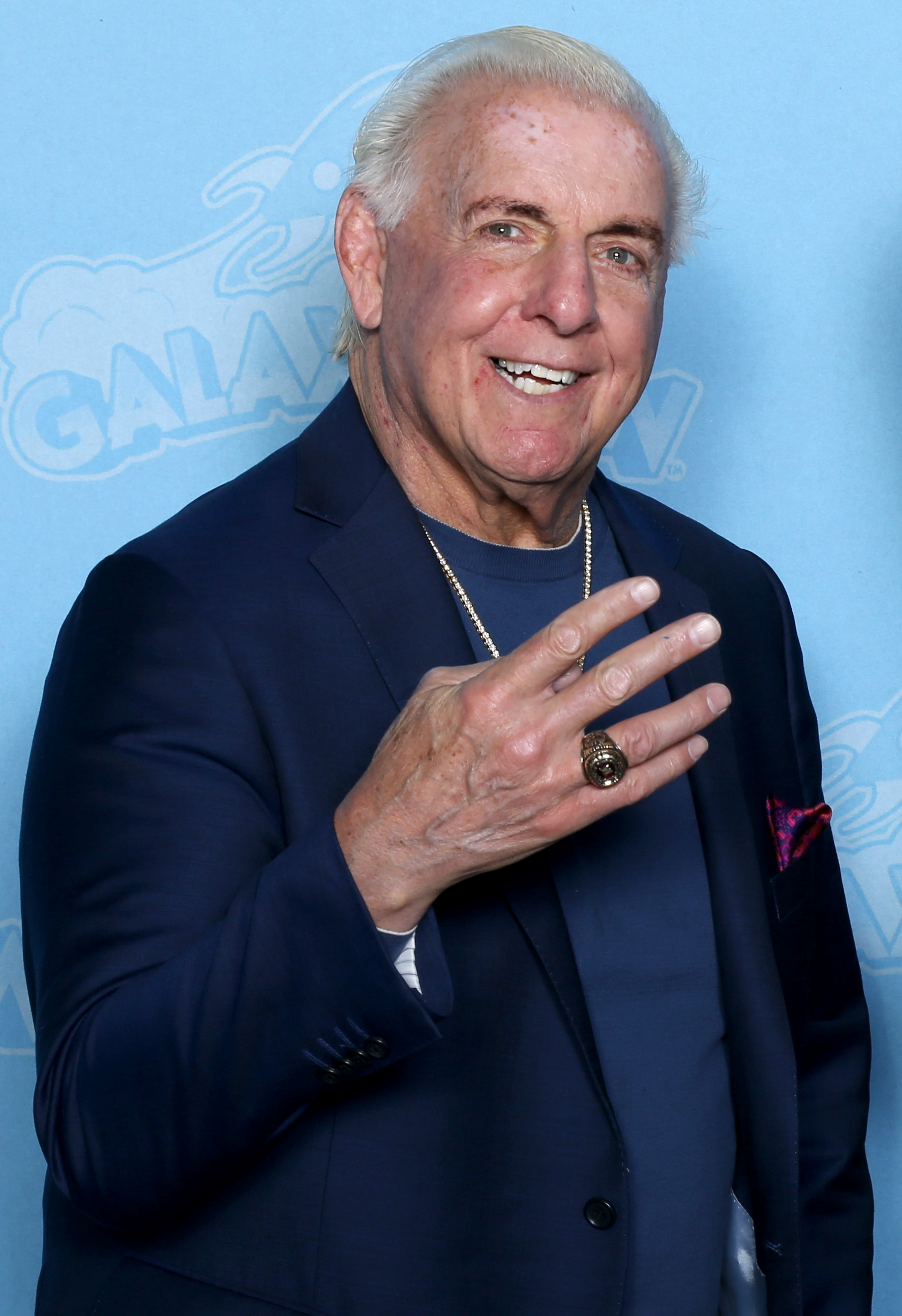
Ric Flair

- February 1 – Joan Burton, Irish politician
- February 2
  - Duncan Bannatyne, Scottish entrepreneur
  - Brent Spiner, American actor
- February 3 – Hennie Kuiper, Dutch cyclist
- February 4 – Rasim Delić, Bosnian military chief of staff and convicted war criminal (d. 2010)
- February 6 – Jim Sheridan, Irish film director
- February 8 – Florinda Meza, Mexican actress, television producer, and screenwriter (best known as Doña Florinda in El Chavo del Ocho)
- February 9 – Judith Light, American actress
- February 10 – Maxime Le Forestier, French singer
- February 21 – Ronnie Hellström, Swedish footballer (d. 2022)
- February 22 – Niki Lauda, Austrian triple Formula 1 world champion (d. 2019)
- February 25 – Ric Flair, American professional wrestler
- February 26 – Simon Crean, Australian politician (d. 2023)
- February 27 – Mary Gibby, British botanist and professor (d. 2024)

=== March ===
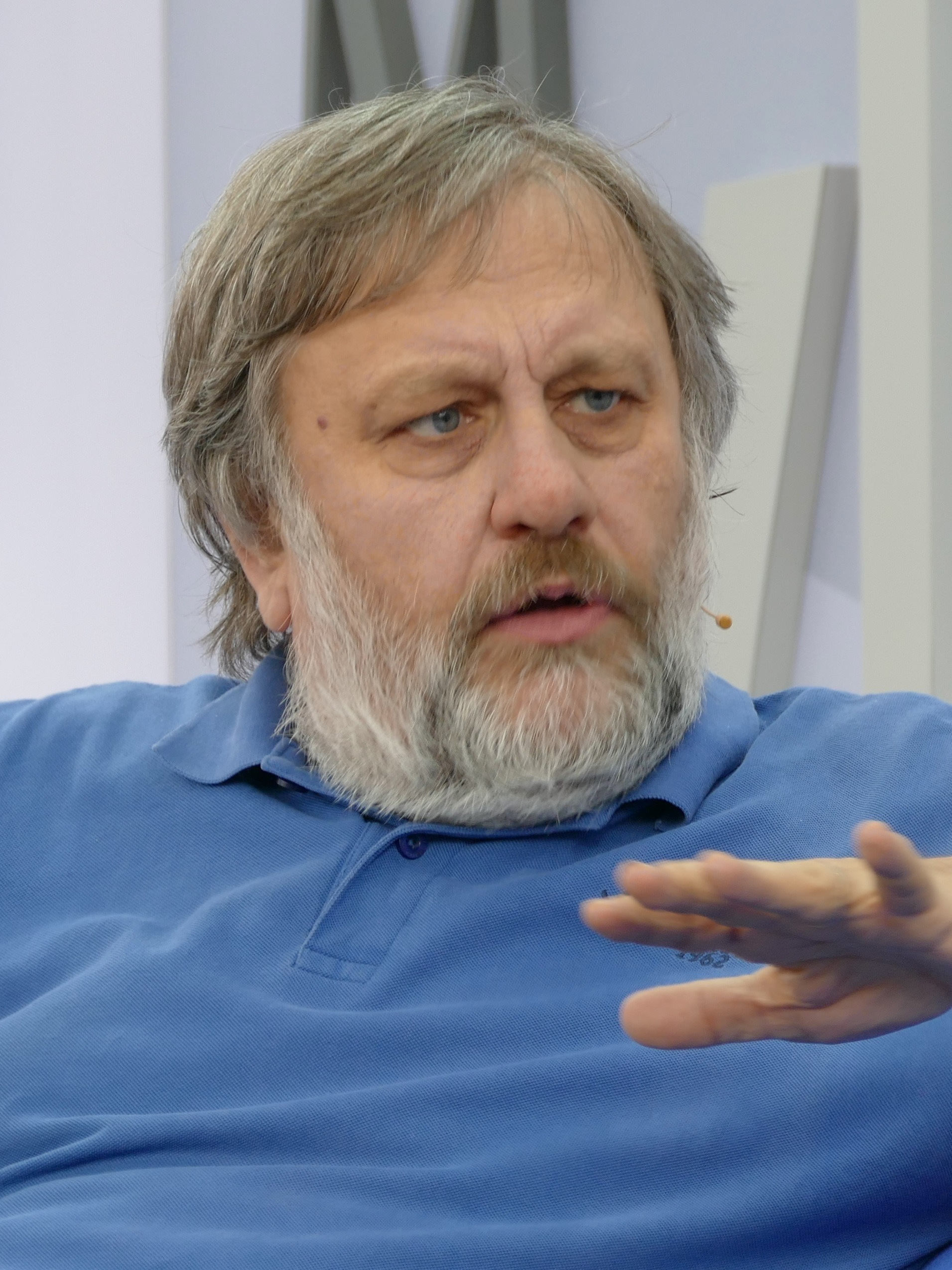
Slavoj Žižek

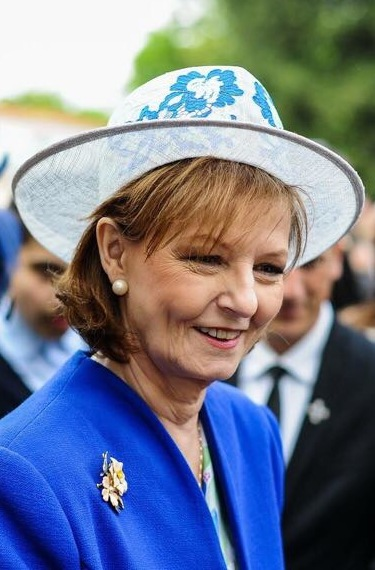
Margareta of Romania

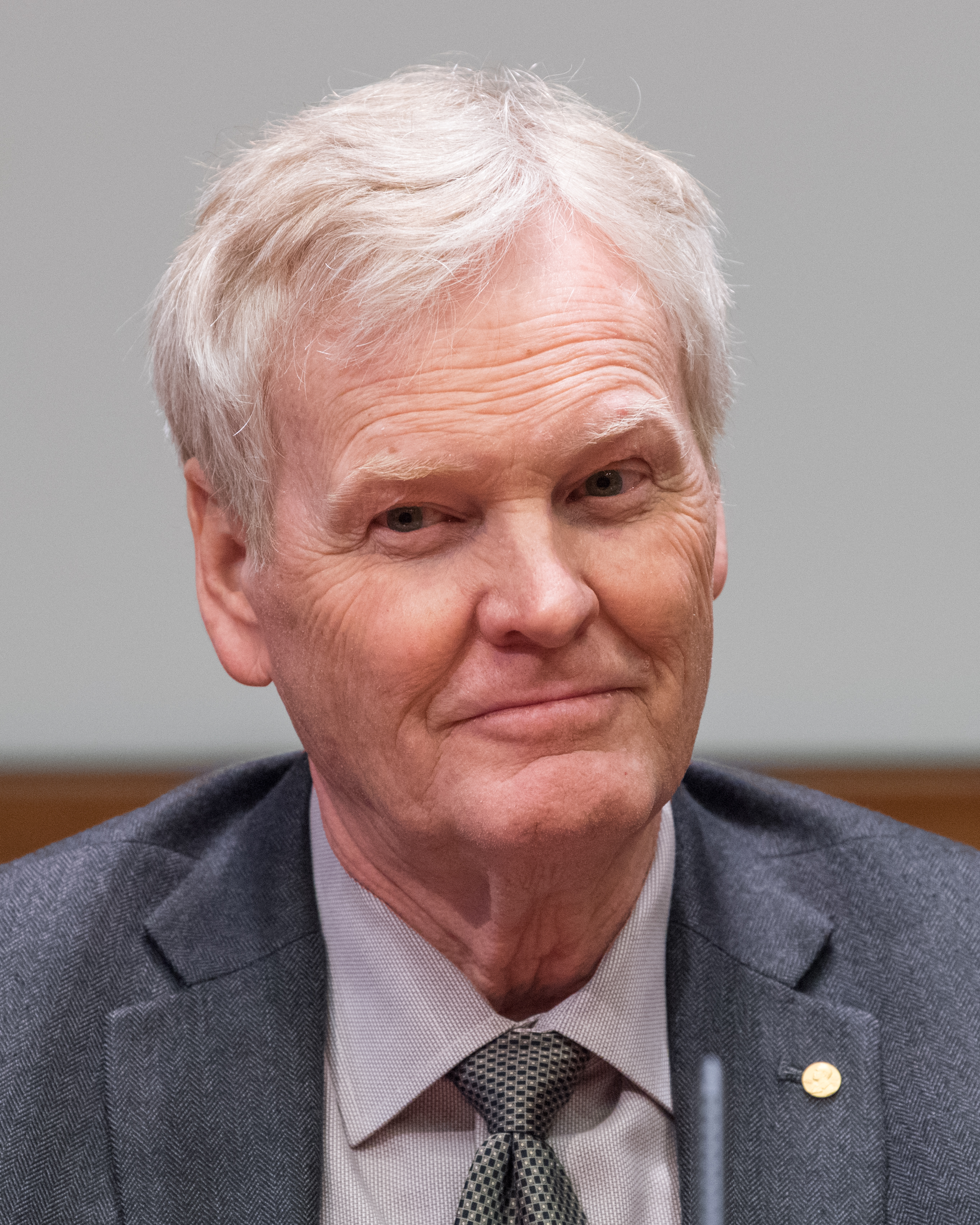
Michael W. Young

- March 2
  - Gates McFadden, American actress, choreographer
  - J. P. R. Williams, Welsh rugby player (d. 2024)
  - Dinesh Gunawardena, Sri Lankan politician, 15th Prime Minister of Sri Lanka
- March 3 – Elijah Harper, Canadian Aboriginal activist (d. 2013)
- March 5 – Franz Josef Jung, German politician
- March 6
  - Shaukat Aziz, Prime Minister of Pakistan
  - Martin Buchan, Scottish footballer
- March 7 – Ghulam Nabi Azad, Indian politician
- March 8 – Cho Yang-ho, South Korean businessman (d. 2019)
- March 9
  - Kalevi Aho, Finnish composer
  - Tapani Kansa, Finnish singer (d. 2025)
- March 10 – Nobu Matsuhisa, Japanese chef
- March 11 – Georg Schramm, German psychologist, Kabarett artist
- March 12
  - Rob Cohen, American film director, producer and writer
  - Mike Gibbins, Welsh drummer (d. 2005)
  - Natalia Kuchinskaya, Soviet gymnast
- March 13 – Julia Migenes, American soprano
- March 16
  - Erik Estrada, American actor and police officer (CHiPs)
  - Victor Garber, Canadian actor (Godspell, Alias)
- March 17
  - Patrick Duffy, American actor
  - Pat Rice, Irish footballer, football manager
- March 18 – Alex Higgins, Northern Irish snooker player (d. 2010)
- March 19
  - Hirofumi Hirano, Japanese politician, Chief Cabinet Secretary
  - Valery Leontiev, Soviet and Russian actor and singer
- March 21
  - Eddie Money, American rock guitarist and singer (d. 2019)
  - Slavoj Žižek, Slovenian philosopher
- March 22 – Fanny Ardant, French actress
- March 24 – Ranil Wickremesinghe, 9th President of Sri Lanka, 10th Prime Minister of Sri Lanka
- March 25 – Sue Klebold, American activist
- March 26
  - Rudi Koertzen, South African cricket umpire (d. 2022)
  - Vicki Lawrence, American comedian, singer and game show hostess
  - Margareta of Romania, Romanian princess and diplomat
  - Giuseppe Sabadini, Italian footballer
  - Patrick Süskind, German writer
  - Ernest Lee Thomas, African-American actor (What's Happening!!)
- March 28
  - Ronnie Ray Smith, American Olympic athlete (d. 2013)
  - Michael W. Young, American geneticist, chronobiologist and recipient of the Nobel Prize in Physiology or Medicine
- March 29
  - Michael Brecker, American jazz musician (d. 2007)
  - John Spenkelink, American murderer (d. 1979)
- March 30 – Lene Lovich, American singer

=== April ===
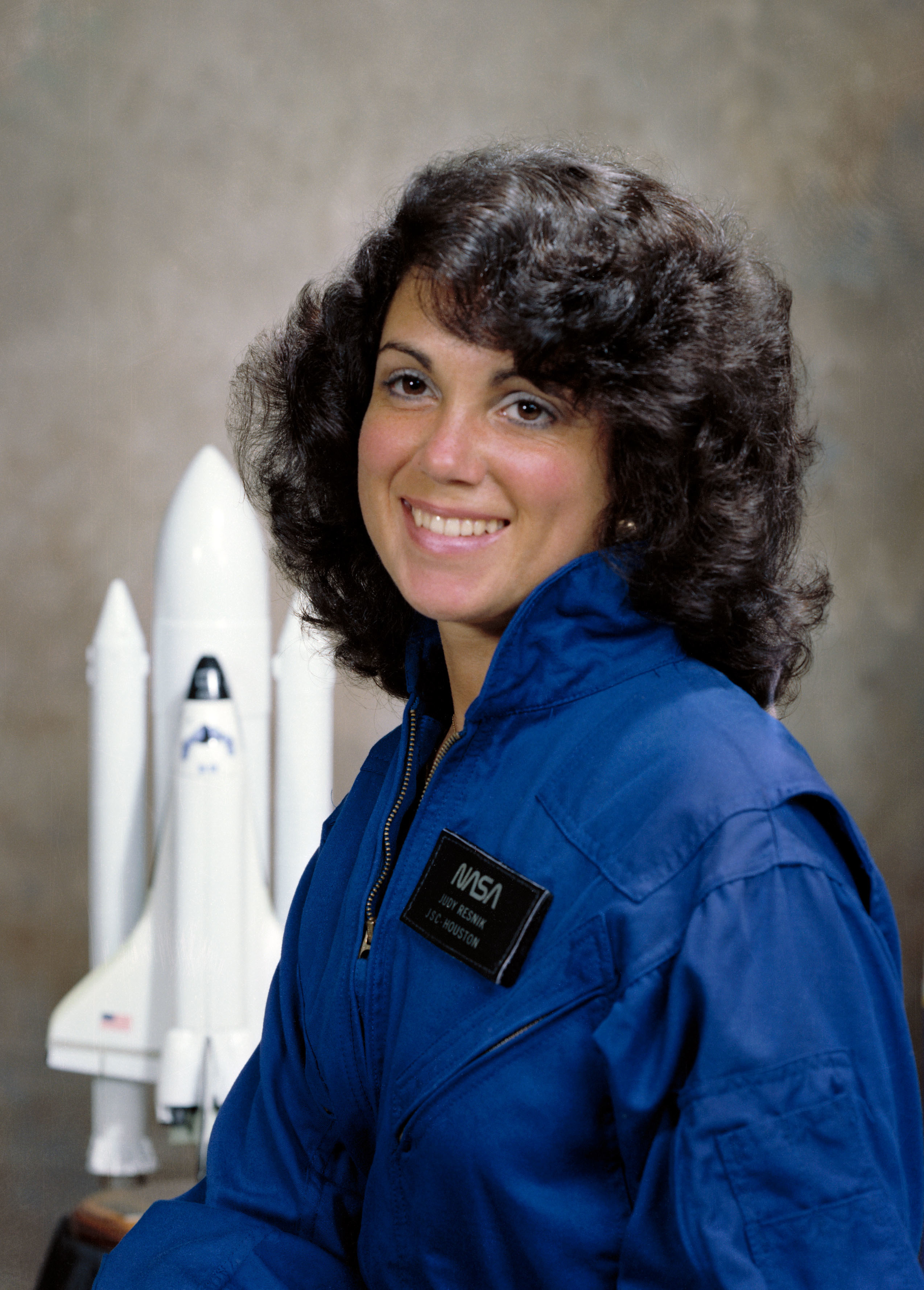
Judith Resnik

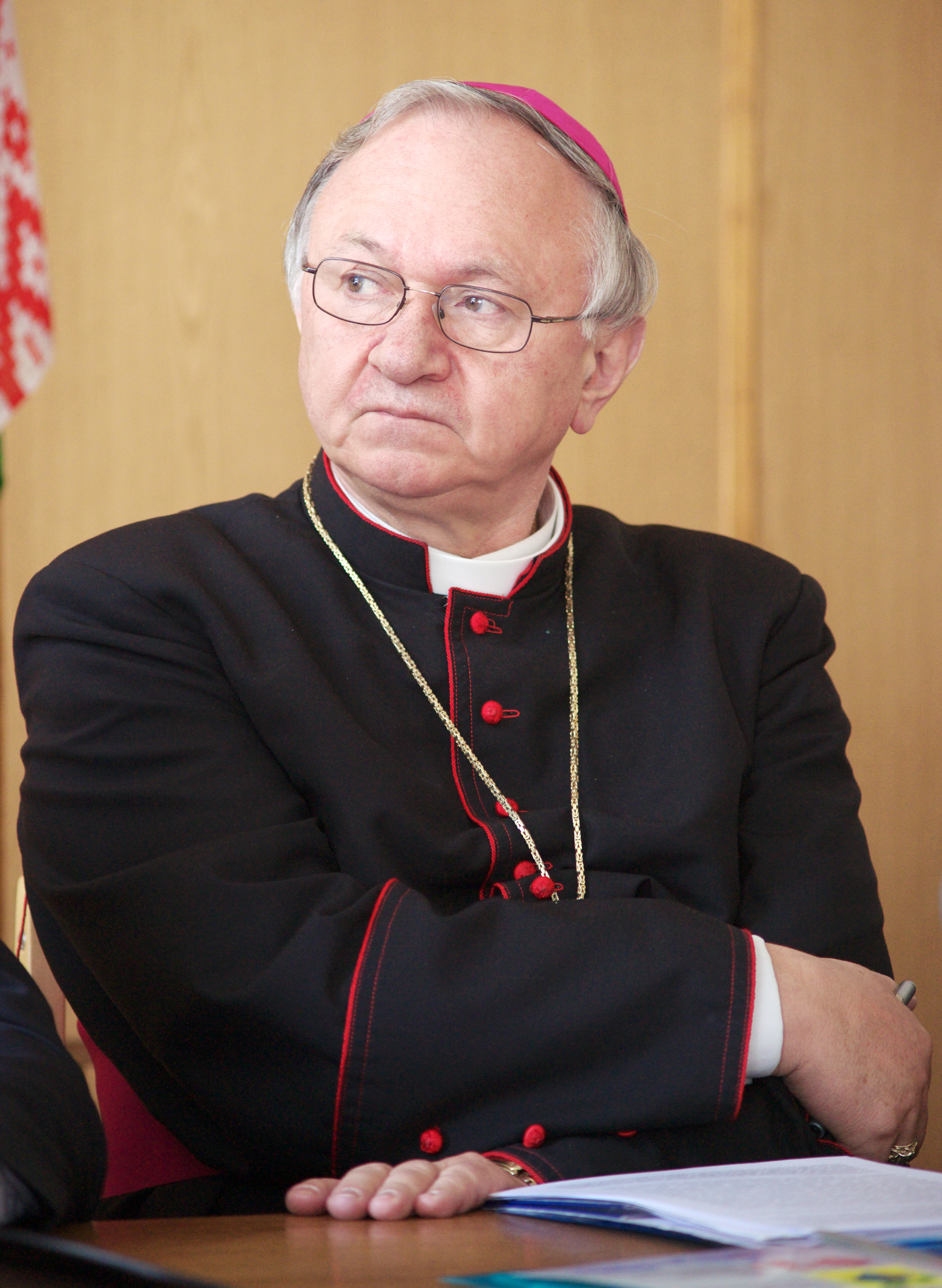
Zygmunt Zimowski

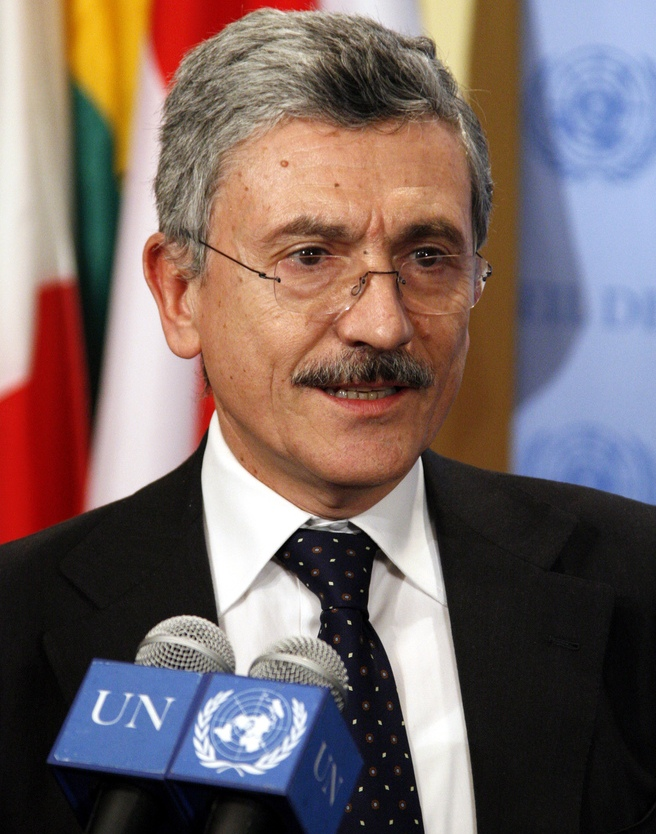
Massimo D'Alema

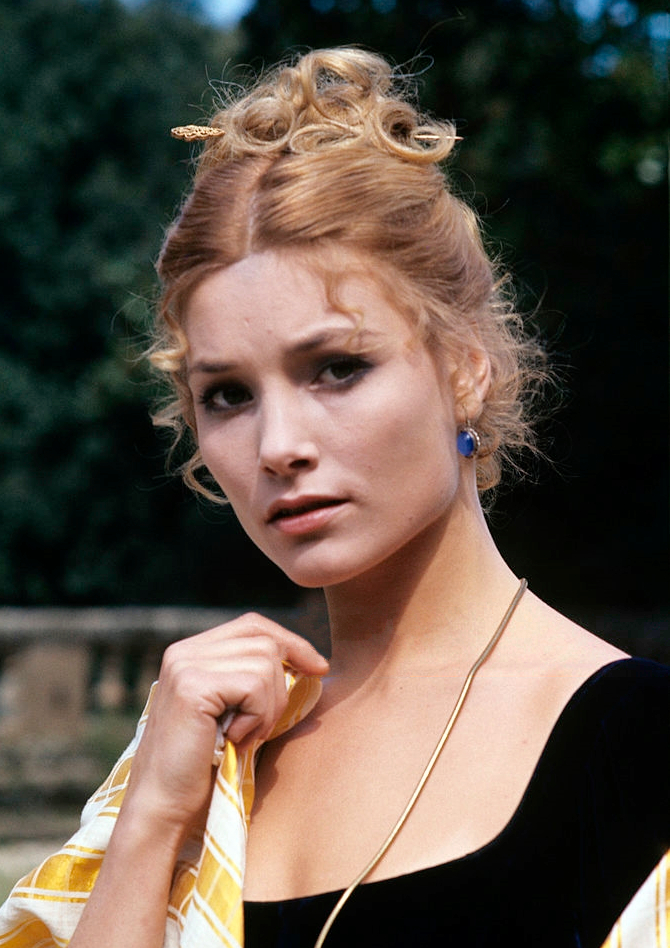
Janet Ågren

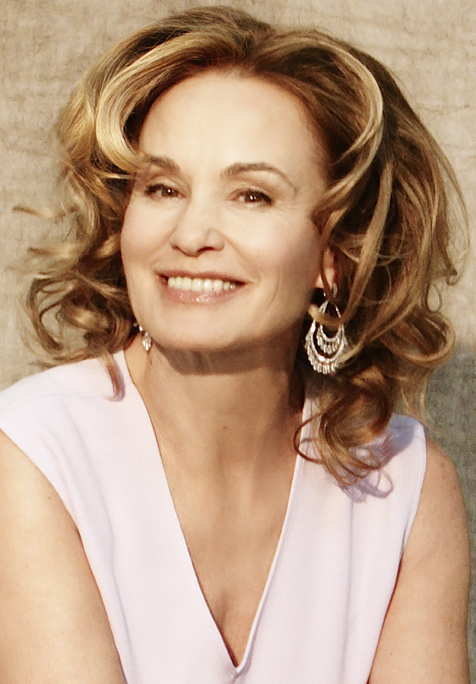
Jessica Lange

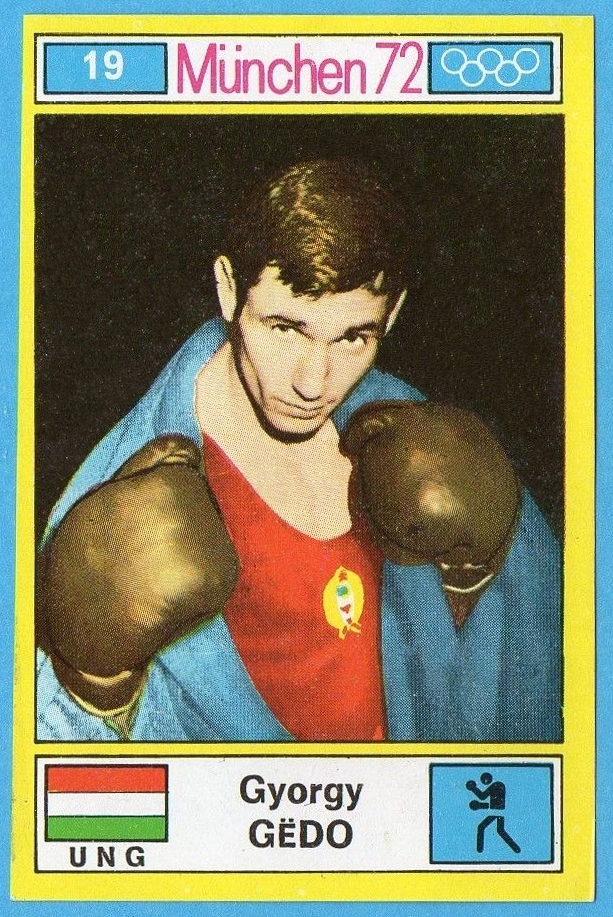
György Gedó

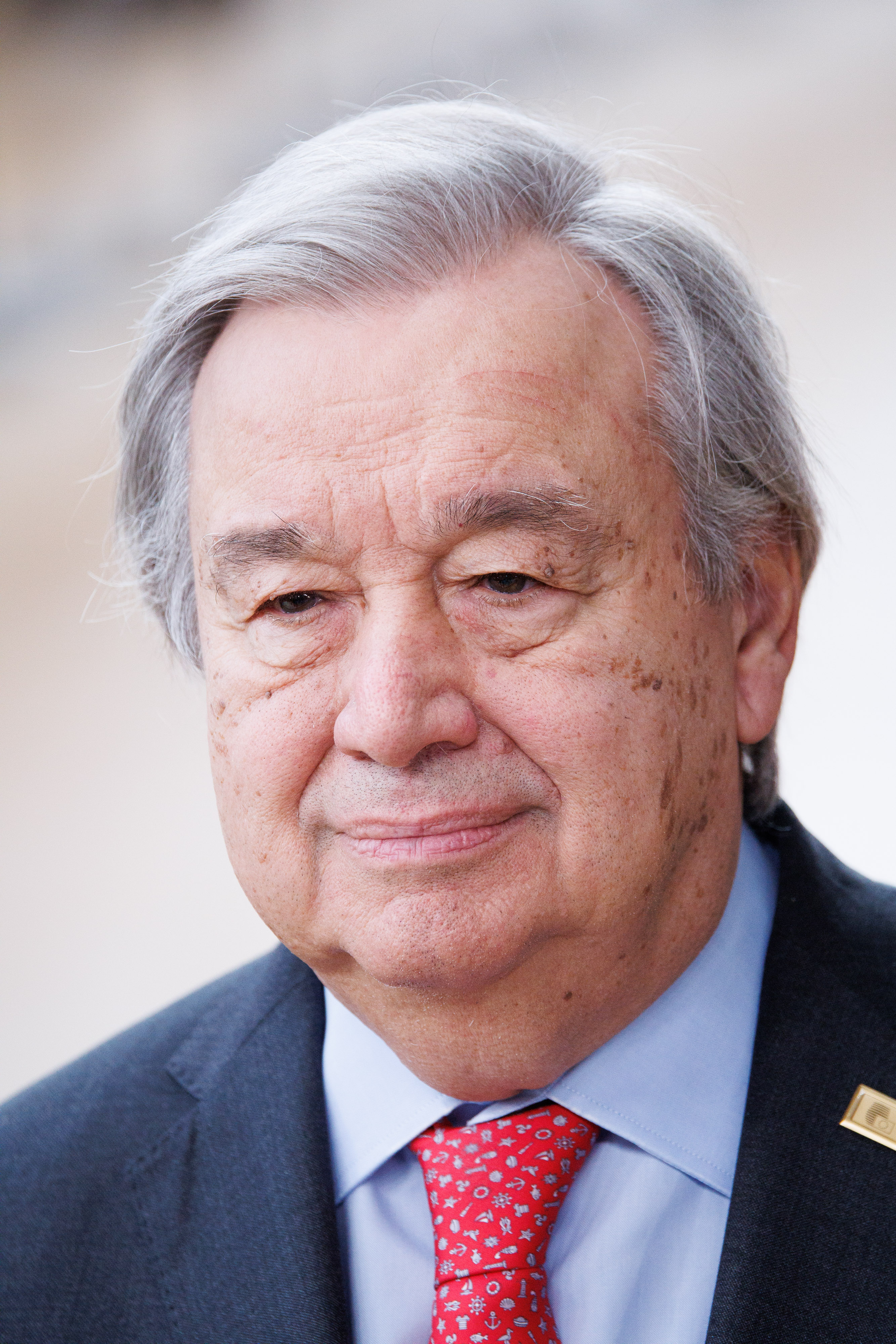
António Guterres

- April 1
  - Gérard Mestrallet, French businessman
  - Sammy Nelson, Northern Irish footballer
  - Gil Scott-Heron, American musician, composer and activist (d. 2011)
- April 2 – Pamela Reed, American actress
- April 3 – Richard Thompson, English musician, songwriter
- April 4 – Parveen Babi, Bollywood actress (d. 2005)
- April 5 – Judith Resnik, American astronaut (d. 1986)
- April 6
  - Janet Ågren, Swedish actress and model
  - Horst Ludwig Störmer, German-born physicist, Nobel Prize laureate
- April 7
  - Mitch Daniels, American academic administrator, businessman, author, and politician
  - Zygmunt Zimowski, Polish bishop (d. 2016)
- April 8
  - Alex Fergusson, Scottish politician (d. 2018)
  - Brenda Russell, American-Canadian singer, songwriter and keyboardist
  - Fanie de Jager, South African operatic tenor
- April 10 – Daniel Mangeas, French bicycle commentator
- April 11 – Bernd Eichinger, German film producer, director (d. 2011)
- April 13 – Christopher Hitchens, English writer (d. 2011)
- April 14 – John Shea, American actor
- April 15
  - Alla Pugacheva, Russian musical performer
  - Aleksandra Ziółkowska-Boehm, Polish-born writer
- April 18
  - Antônio Fagundes, Brazilian actor
  - Bengt Holmström, Finnish-born economist, Nobel Prize laureate
- April 19 – Sergey Nikolayevich Volkov, Russian figure skater (d. 1990)
- April 20
  - Massimo D'Alema, 53rd prime minister of Italy
  - Veronica Cartwright, English-born American actress
  - Jessica Lange, American actress
- April 21 – Patti LuPone, American actress
- April 23 – György Gedó, Hungarian Olympic boxer
- April 24 – Véronique Sanson, French singer, songwriter
- April 28 – Bruno Kirby, American actor (d. 2006)
- April 30 – António Guterres, Prime Minister of Portugal, 9th secretary-general of the United Nations

=== May ===
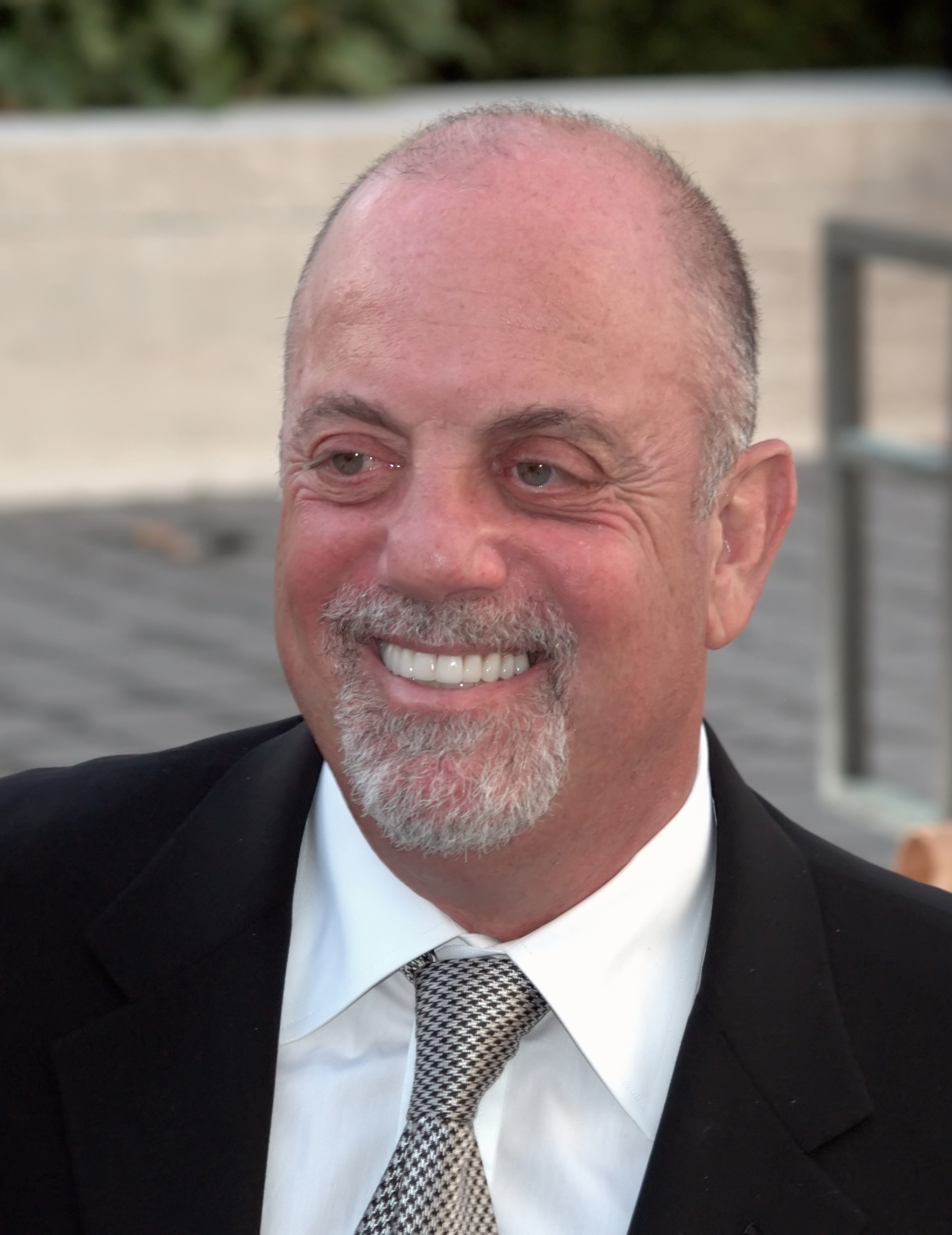
Billy Joel

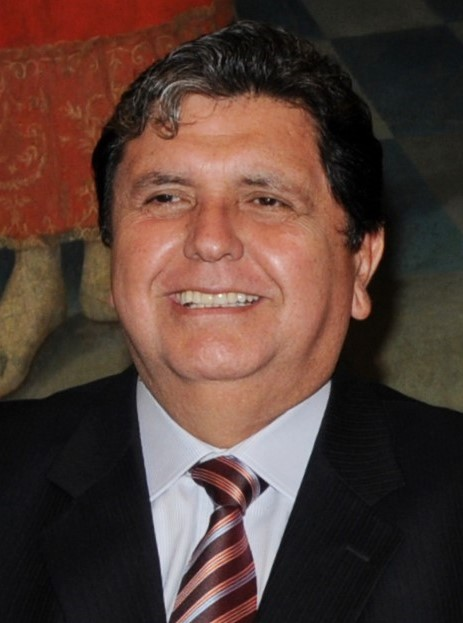
Alan García

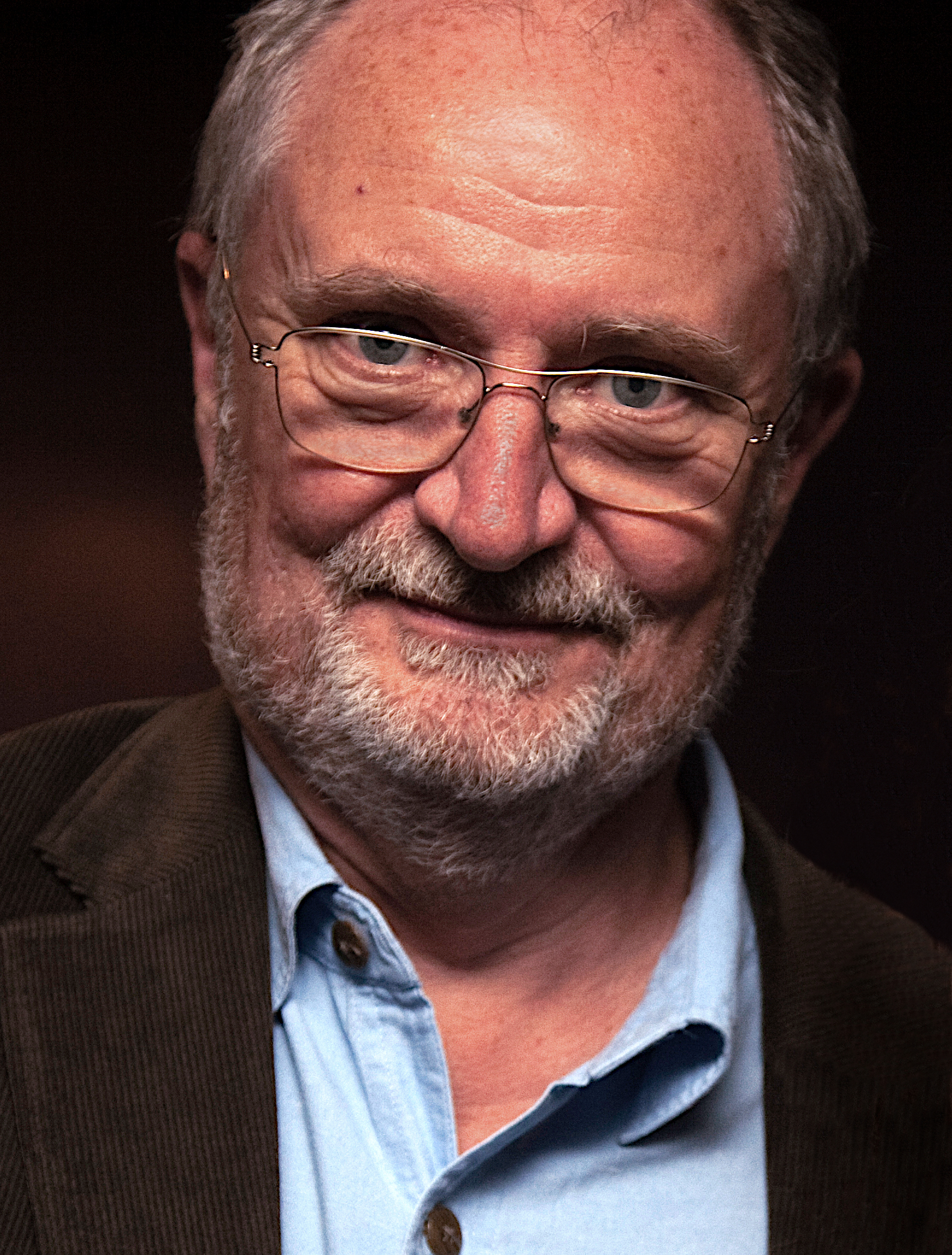
Jim Broadbent

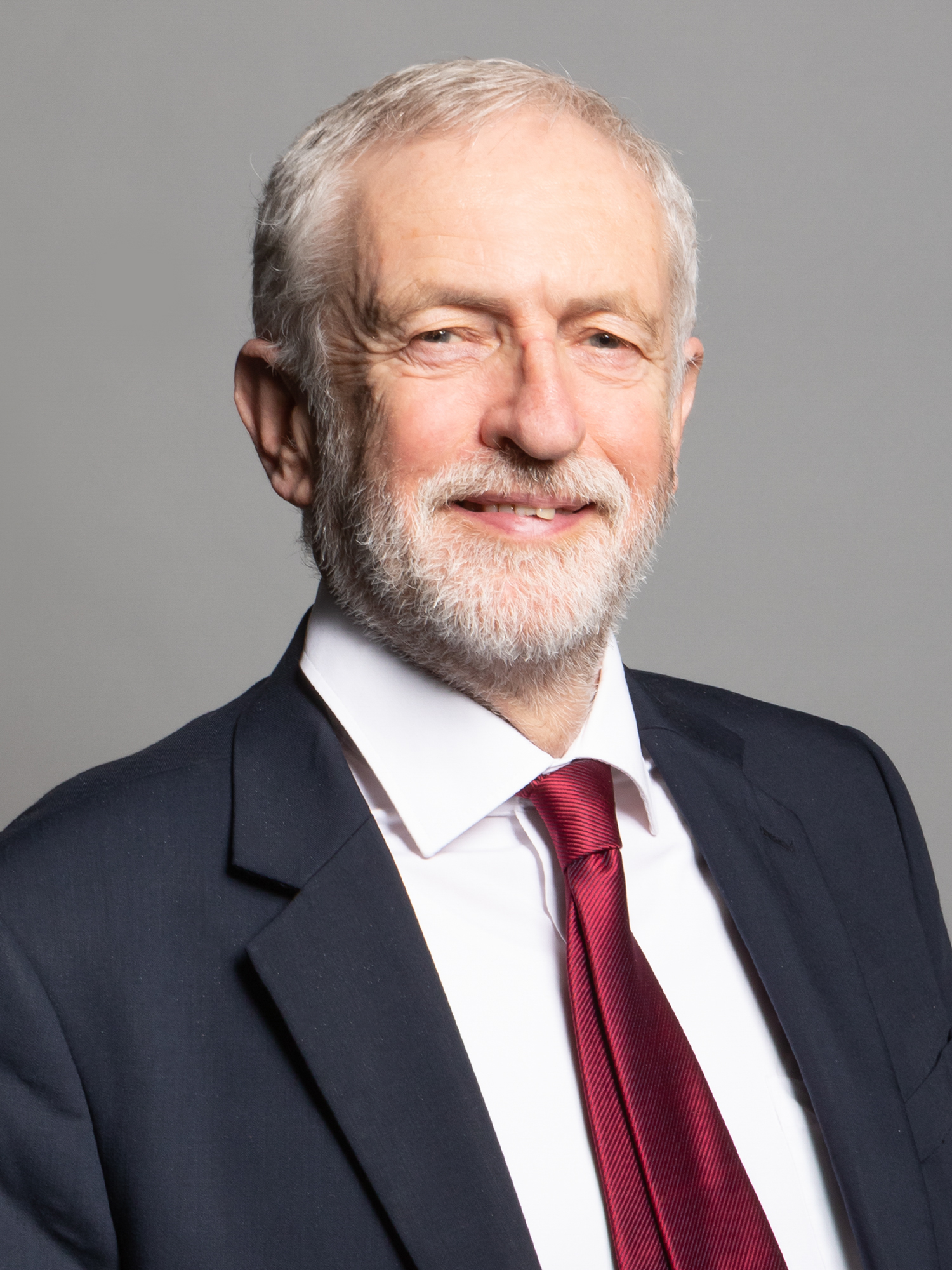
Jeremy Corbyn

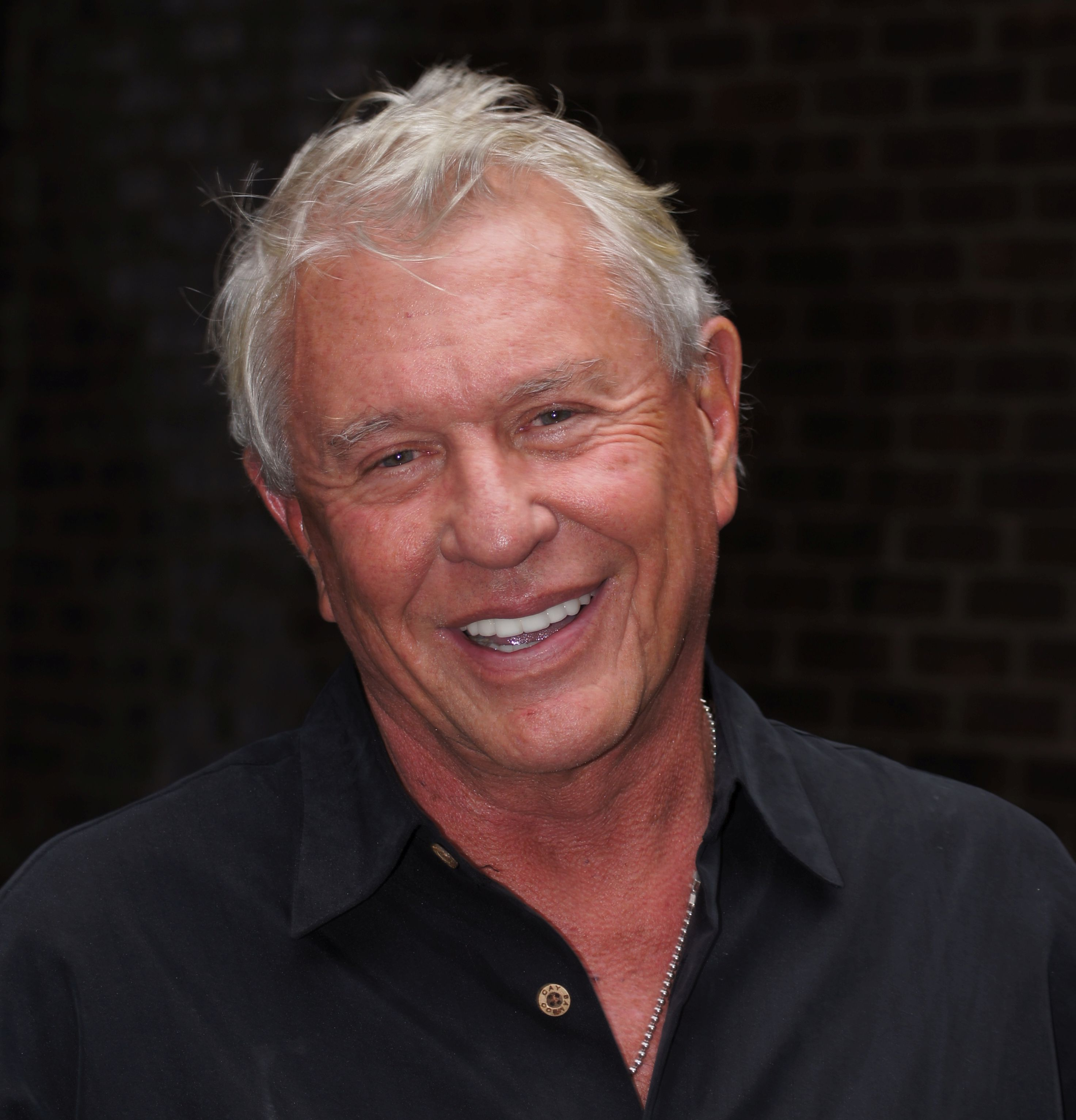
Tom Berenger

- May 2 – Alan Titchmarsh, English gardener
- May 3 – Leopoldo Luque, Argentine soccer player (d. 2021)
- May 4 – John Force an American NHRA drag racer
- May 6 – Larry Rivers, Basketball player for the Harlem Globetrotters (d. 2023)
- May 9
  - Billy Joel, American singer, songwriter and pianist
  - Ibrahim Baré Maïnassara, military President of Niger (d. 1999)
- May 10 – Mahfuzur Rahman Khan, Bangladeshi cinematographer (d. 2019)
- May 13 – Zoë Wanamaker, American-British actress
- May 14 – Sverre Årnes, Norwegian writer
- May 17 – Bill Bruford, English drummer
- May 18
  - Rick Wakeman, English rock musician, songwriter
  - Bill Wallace, Canadian rock musician (The Guess Who)
- May 19
  - Dusty Hill, American bassist (ZZ Top) (d. 2021)
  - Ashraf Ghani, President of Afghanistan
- May 20 – Dave Thomas, Canadian actor, comedian (Second City Television)
- May 21 – Andrew Neil, Scottish journalist and broadcaster
- May 22
  - Cheryl Campbell, English actress
  - Ieuan Wyn Jones, Welsh politician
- May 23 – Alan García, President of Peru (d. 2019)
- May 24
  - Jim Broadbent, English actor
  - Tomaž Pisanski, Slovenian mathematician
- May 25 – Jamaica Kincaid, Antiguan-born novelist
- May 26
  - Ward Cunningham, American computer programmer
  - Jeremy Corbyn, British politician
  - Pam Grier, African-American actress
  - Hank Williams Jr., American country singer
- May 27
  - Jo Ann Harris, American actress
  - Alma Guillermoprieto, Mexican journalist
- May 29 – Francis Rossi, English rock guitarist, singer (Status Quo)
- May 30 – Bob Willis, English cricketer (d. 2019)
- May 31 – Tom Berenger, American actor (Platoon)

=== June ===
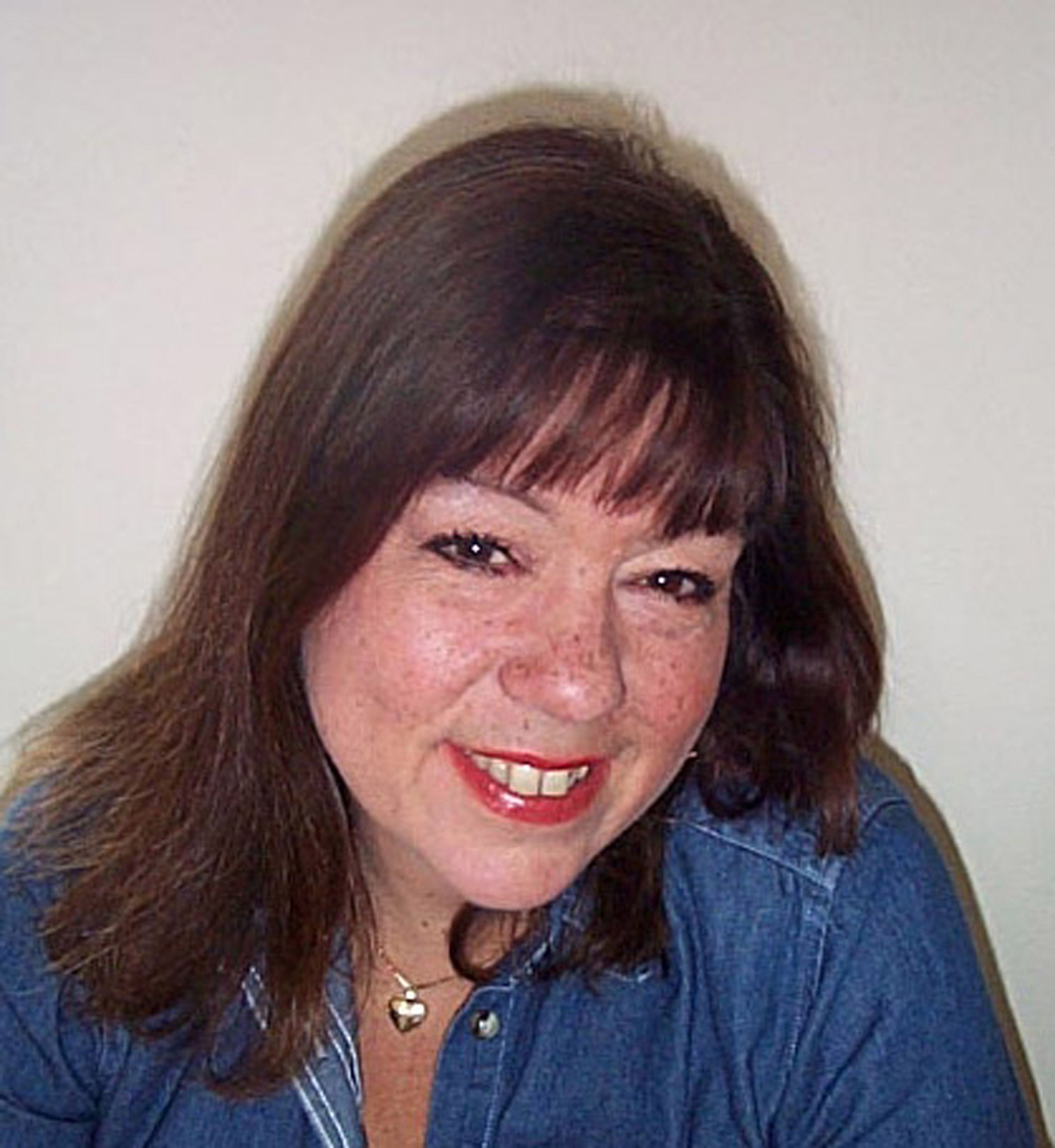
Heather Couper

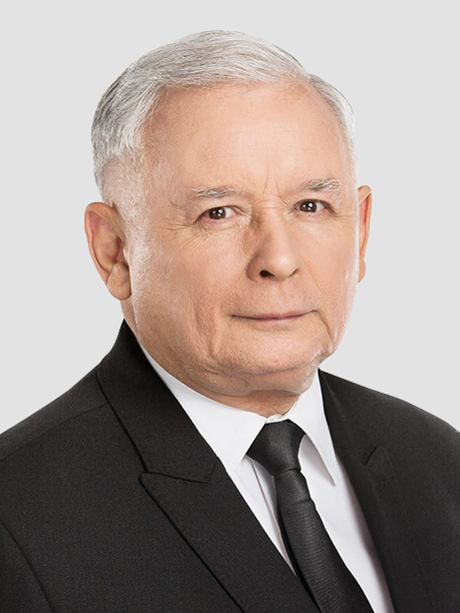
Jarosław Kaczyński

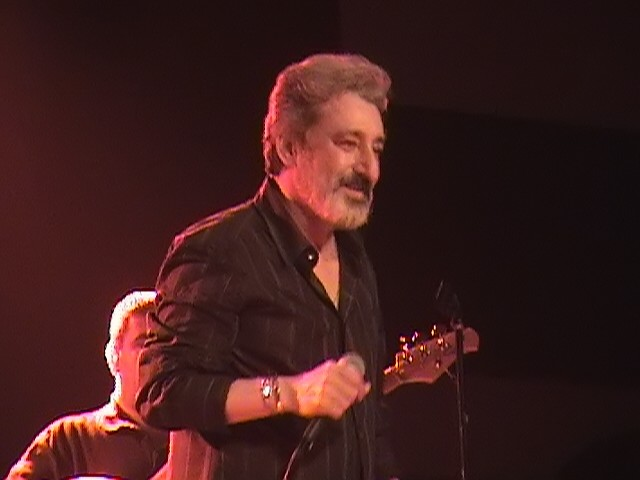
Ebi

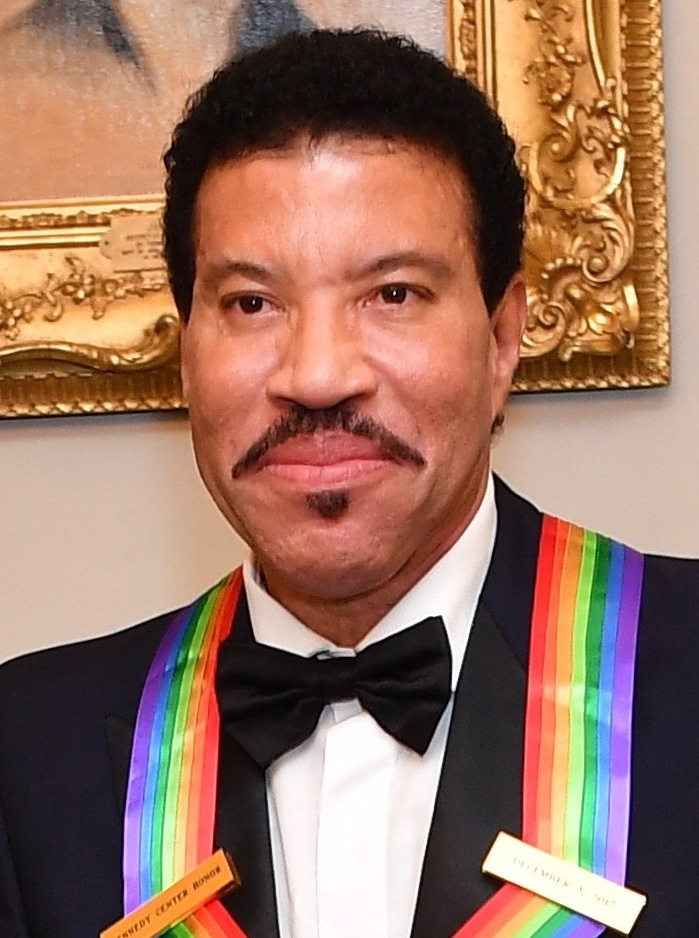
Lionel Richie

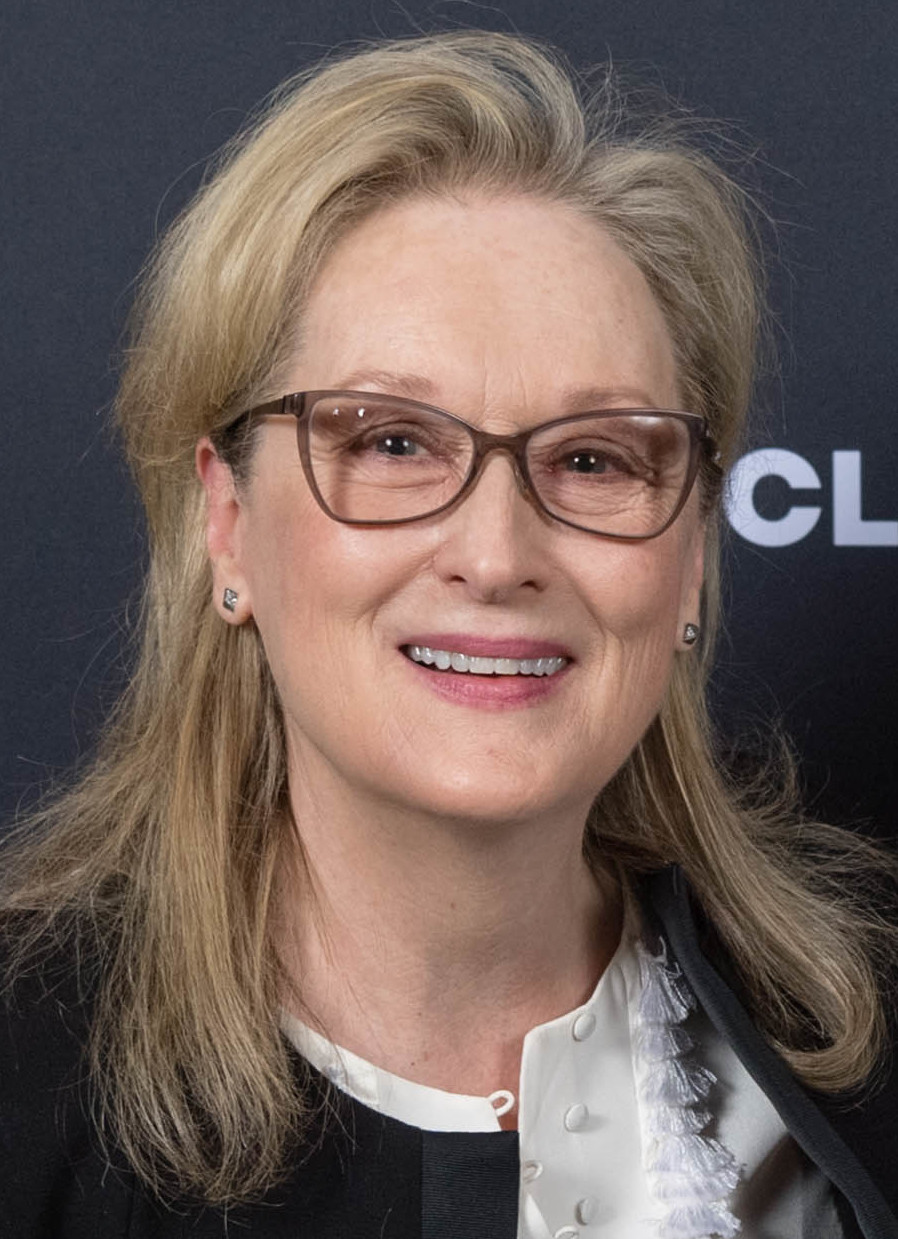
Meryl Streep

- June 1 – Déwé Gorodey, New Caledonian writer and politician (d. 2022)
- June 2 – Heather Couper, British astronomer (d. 2020)
- June 7 – Wendy Sherman, American diplomat and politician
- June 8 – Emanuel Ax, Polish-born American pianist
- June 10 – Bora Dugić, Serbian musician, flautist
- June 11 – Frank Beard, American drummer (ZZ Top) (d. 2026)
- June 13 – Ann Druyan, American popular science writer, wife of Carl Sagan
- June 14
  - Antony Sher, South African-born British actor (d. 2021)
  - Harry Turtledove, American historian, novelist
  - Papa Wemba, Congolese soukous musician (d. 2016)
  - Alan White, English drummer and songwriter (Yes) (d. 2022)
- June 15 – Jim Varney, American actor and comedian (d. 2000)
- June 16 – Robbin Thompson, American singer, songwriter (d. 2015)
- June 18
  - Jarosław Kaczyński, Prime Minister of Poland
  - Lech Kaczyński, President of Poland (d. 2010)
  - Lincoln Thompson, Jamaican musician (d. 1999)
- June 19
  - Ebi, Iranian singer
  - Hassan Shehata, Egyptian footballer and coach
- June 20
  - Gotabaya Rajapaksa, 8th President of Sri Lanka
  - Lionel Richie, African-American urban musician
- June 21
  - Shane Molloy, Australian rules footballer
  - Stuart Pearson, English football player
  - Jane Urquhart, Canadian author
- June 22
  - Alan Osmond, American pop singer (d. 2026)
  - Meryl Streep, American actress
  - Lindsay Wagner, American actress
  - Elizabeth Warren, American academic and politician, U.S. Senator (D-Mass.) since 2013
- June 23 – Jon McLachlan, New Zealand rugby union player
- June 25
  - Brigitte Bierlein, first female chancellor of Austria (d. 2024)
  - Lalith Kaluperuma, Sri Lankan test cricketer and ODI cricketer
  - Patrick Tambay, French racing driver (d. 2022)
  - Yoon Joo-sang, South Korean actor
- June 26
  - Graco Ramírez, governor of Morelos, Mexico 2012–2018
  - Avtar Singh Kang, Punjabi singer and folk contributor
  - Arturo Vázquez Ayala, Mexican footballer
- June 27 – Vera Wang, American fashion designer
- June 29 – Lisette Sevens, Dutch field hockey defender
- June 30
  - Silvio Aquino, Salvadoran football player
  - Uwe Kliemann, German football player and coach
  - Norm Mitchell, Australian rules footballer
  - Philippe Toussaint, Belgium's most successful golfer

=== July ===
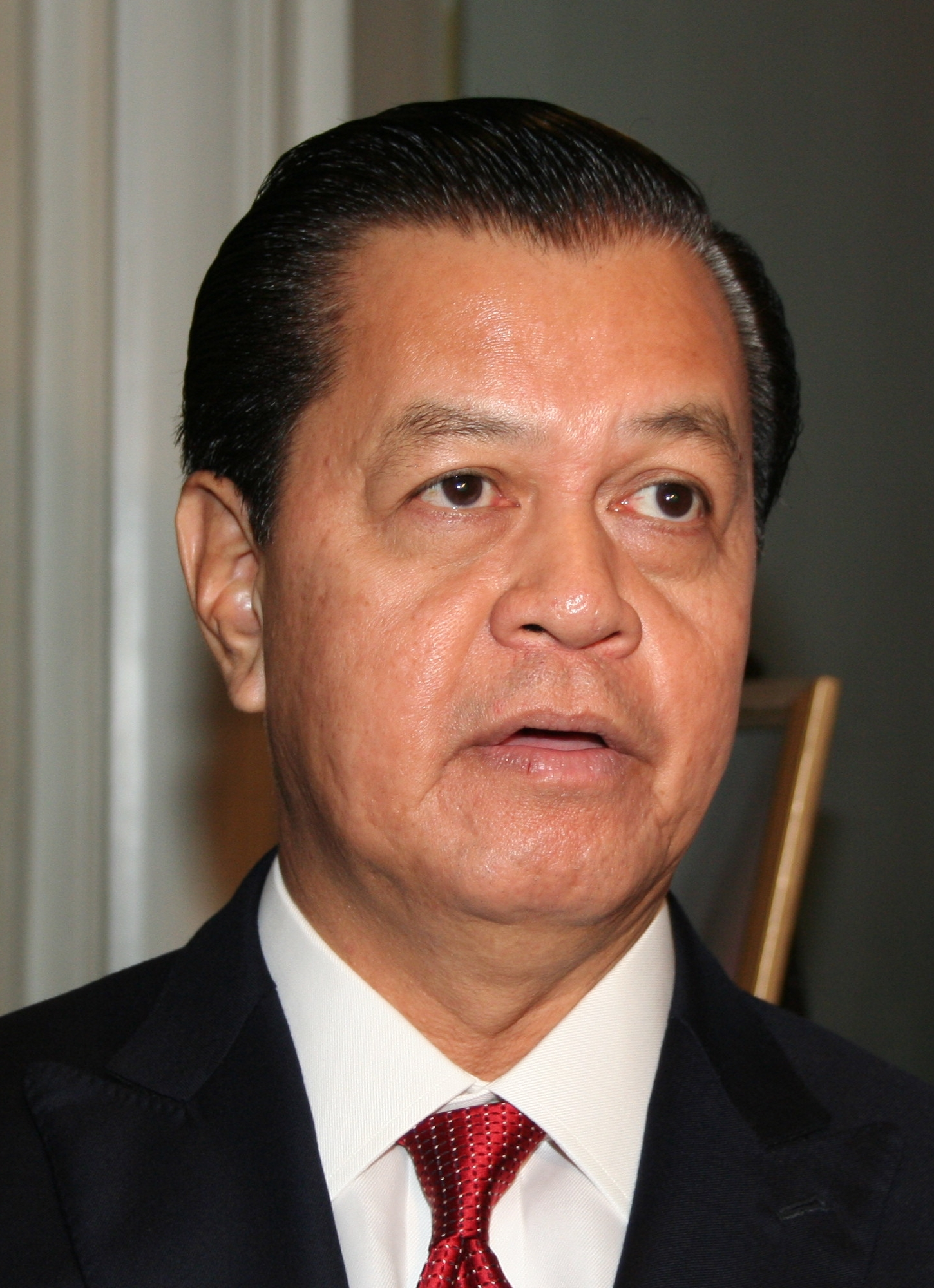
Noli de Castro

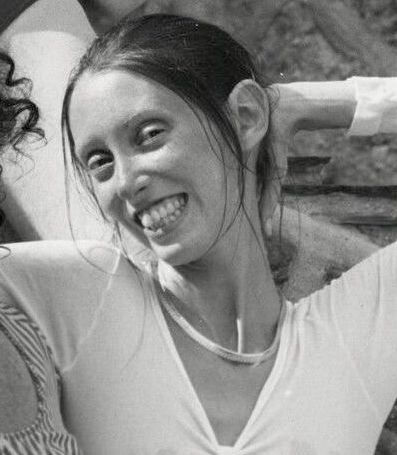
Shelley Duvall

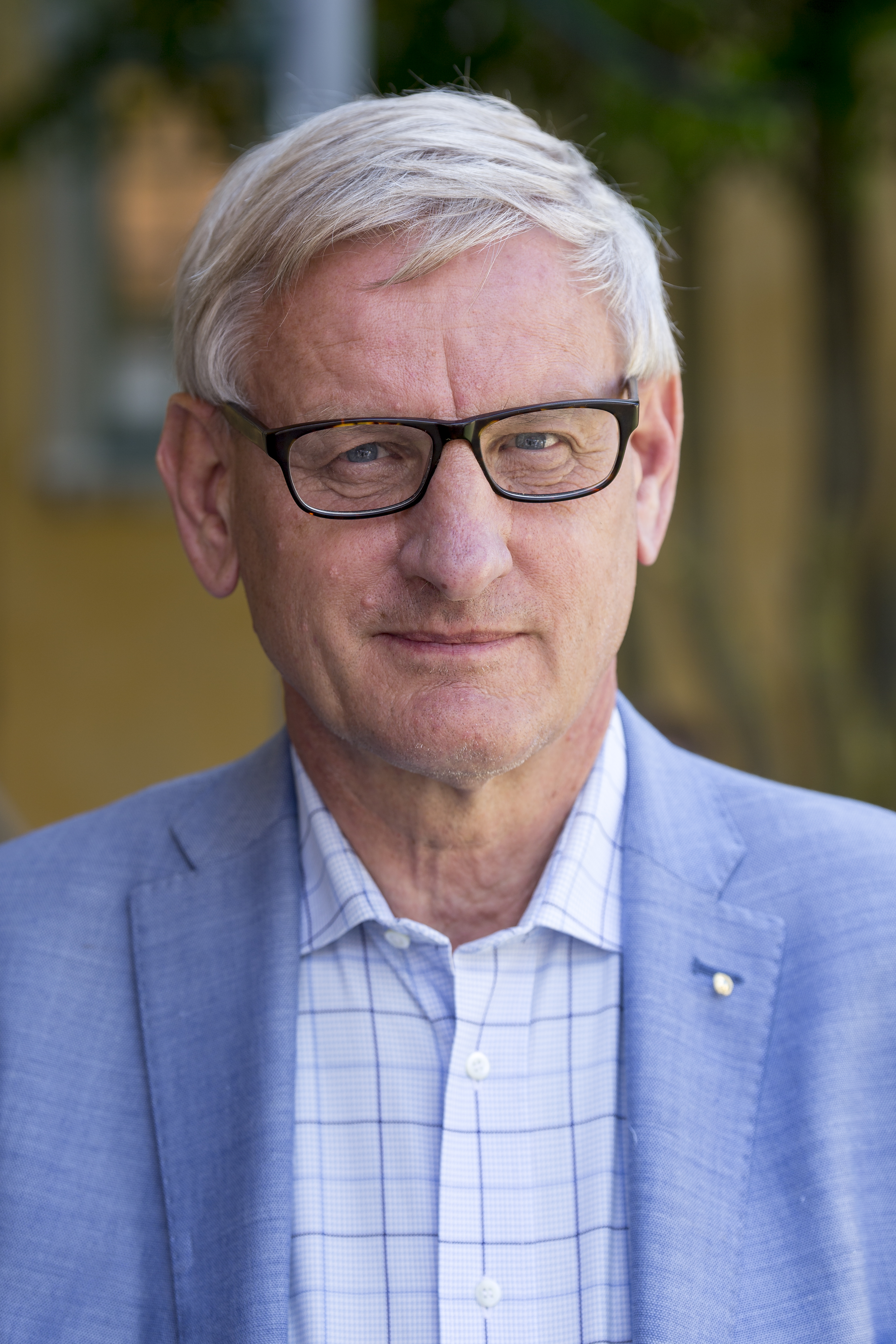
Carl Bildt

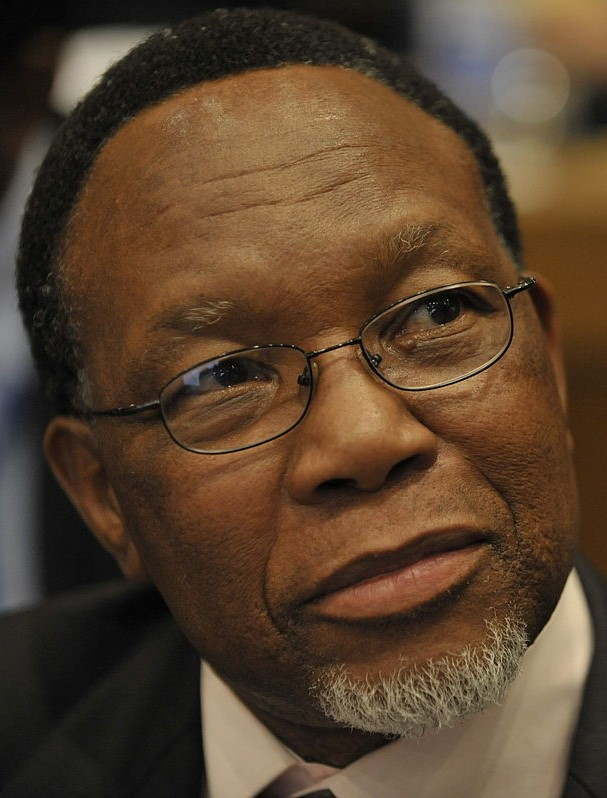
Kgalema Motlanthe

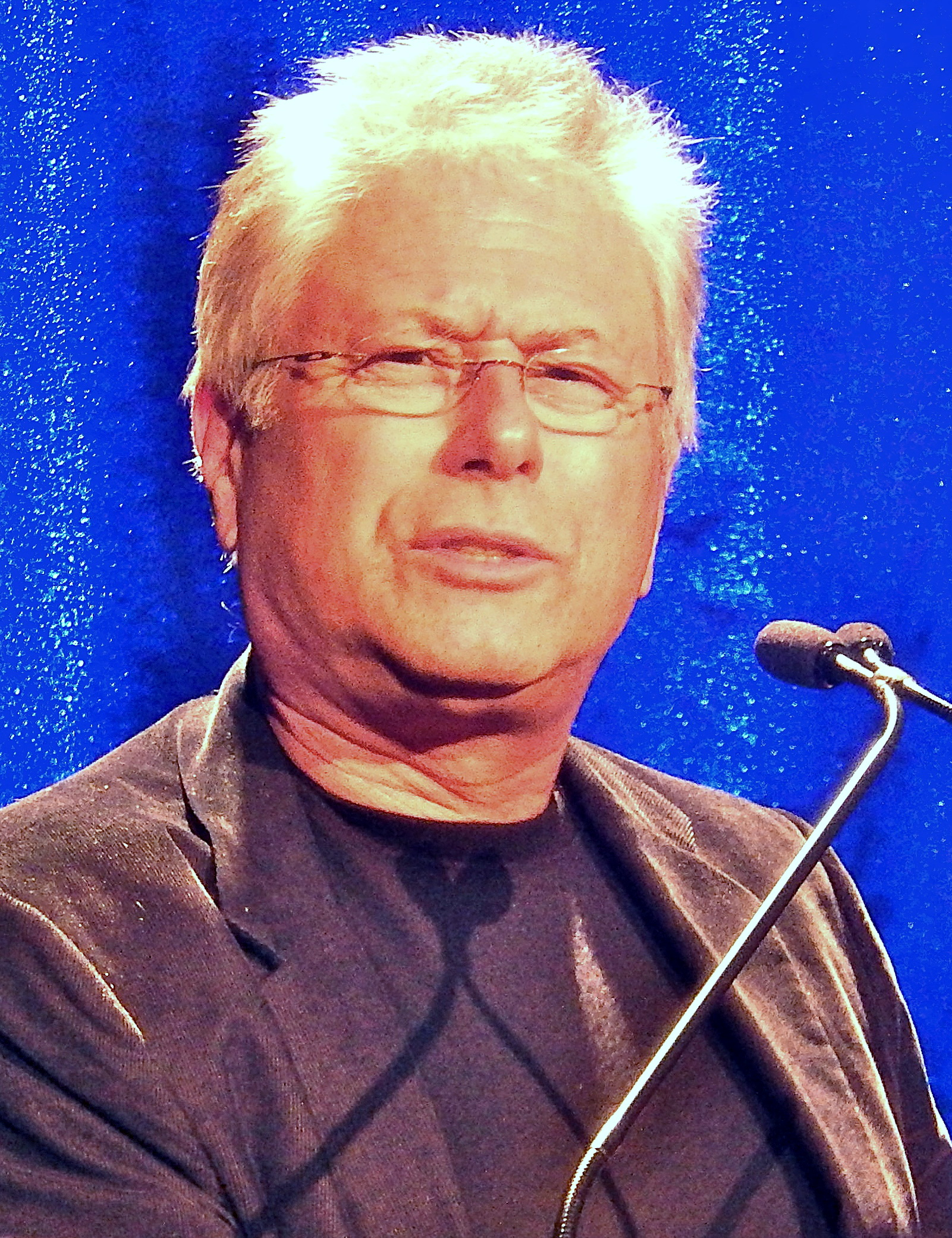
Alan Menken

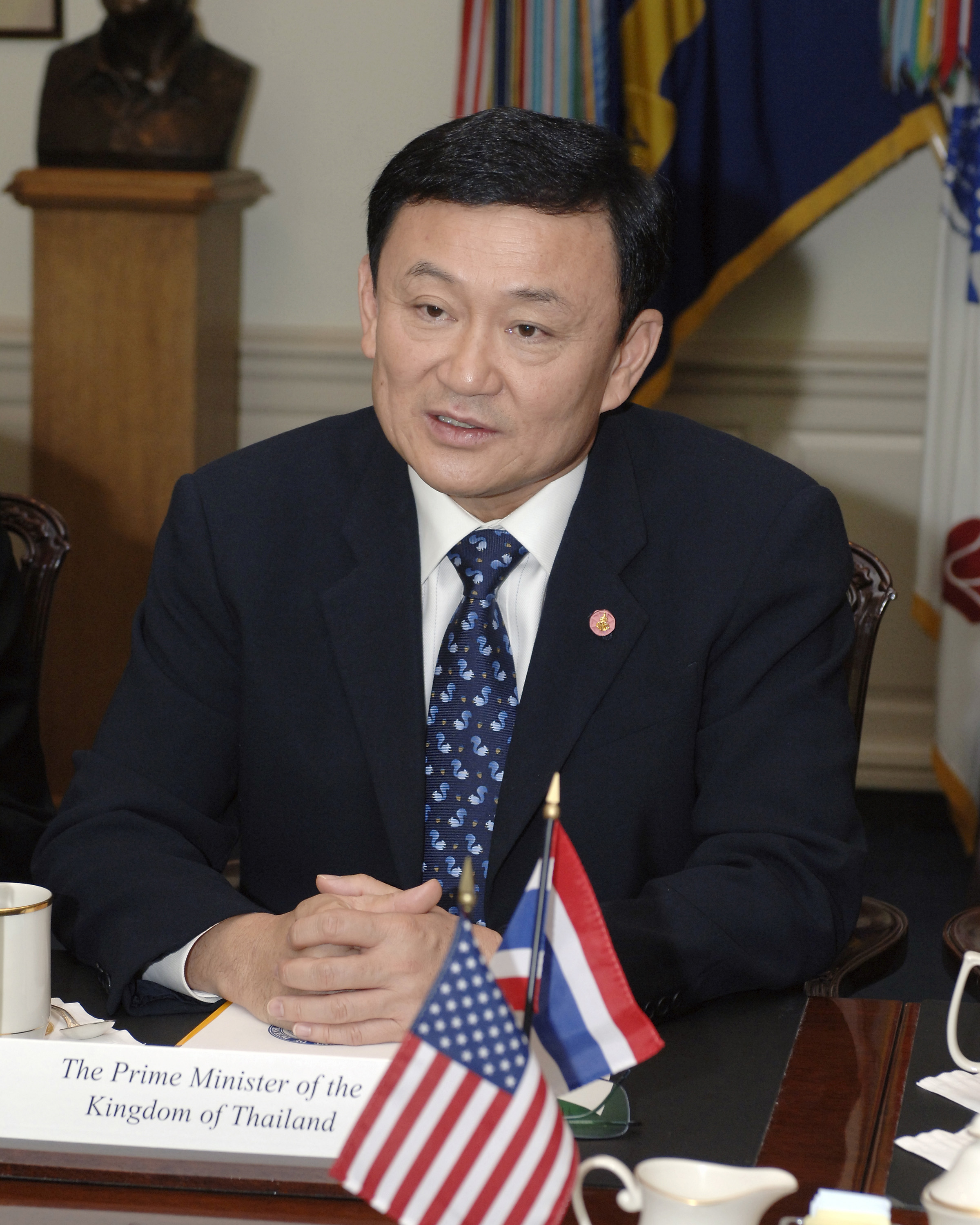
Thaksin Shinawatra

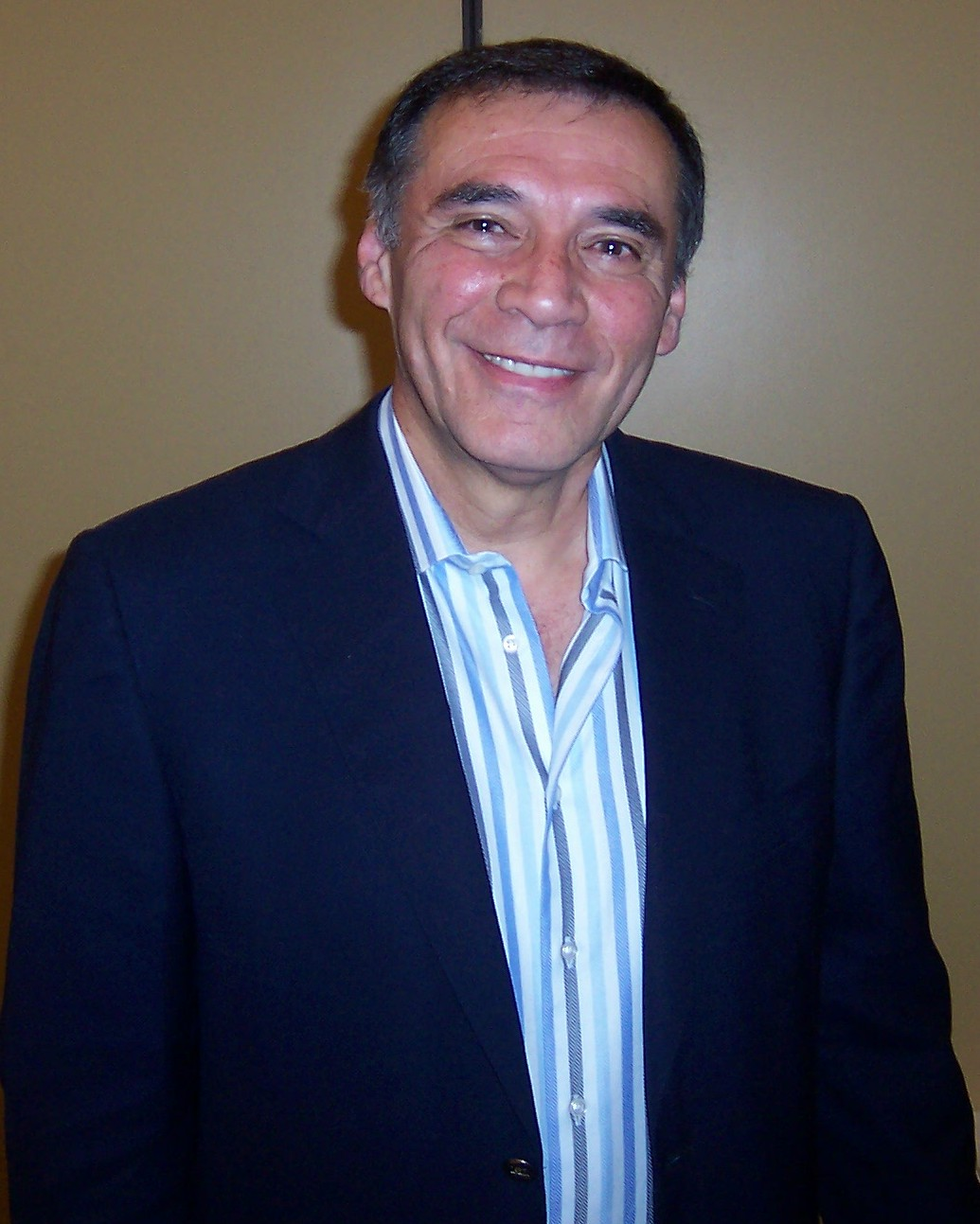
Jamil Mahuad

- July 1
  - Yoshihide Fukao, Japanese volleyball player
  - Seninho, Portuguese-Angolan footballer (d. 2020)
  - Néjia Ben Mabrouk, Tunisian screenwriter, director
  - John Farnham, Australian singer, recording artist and entertainer
- July 2
  - Ben Verbong, Dutch film director, screenwriter
  - Roy Bittan, American Musician
- July 3
  - Mircea Chelaru, Romanian general and politician
  - Alfred Vierling, Dutch politician
- July 5 – Jill Murphy, British author and illustrator (d. 2021)
- July 6 – Noli de Castro, Filipino broadcast journalist, radio commentator and Vice President of the Philippines
- July 7 – Shelley Duvall, American actress (d. 2024)
- July 8
  - Jaroslav Jurka, Czech fencer
  - Wolfgang Puck, Austrian-American celebrity chef, restaurateur, and occasional actor
- July 9
  - Raoul Cédras, former president of Haiti
  - Ali Akbar Abdolrashidi, Iranian intellectual, journalist, writer, traveler, translator, and university lecturer
- July 11
  - Liona Boyd, English classical guitarist
  - Émerson Leão, Brazilian footballer
- July 13 – Helena Fibingerová, Czech athlete
- July 15
  - Carl Bildt, 28th prime minister of Sweden, minister for foreign affairs
  - Trevor Horn, English pop singer, producer
  - Harvey C. Krautschun, American politician (d. 2026)
  - Mohammed bin Rashid Al Maktoum, 3rd prime minister of the United Arab Emirates
- July 17
  - William C. Faure, South African film director (d. 1994)
  - Andrei Fursenko, Russian politician, scientist and businessman
- July 19
  - Kgalema Motlanthe, South African politician, President of South Africa
  - Daniel Vaillant, French Socialist politician
- July 20 – Naseeruddin Shah, Indian actor and environmentalist
- July 22
  - Alan Menken, American composer
  - Lasse Virén, Finnish long-distance runner
- July 24
  - Michael Richards, American actor, comedian
  - Joan Enric Vives Sicília, Spanish archbishop
- July 25 – Francis Smerecki, French football player, manager (d. 2018)
- July 26
  - Thaksin Shinawatra, Prime Minister of Thailand and businessman
  - Roger Taylor, English rock musician (Queen)
- July 29 – Jamil Mahuad, President of Ecuador

=== August ===
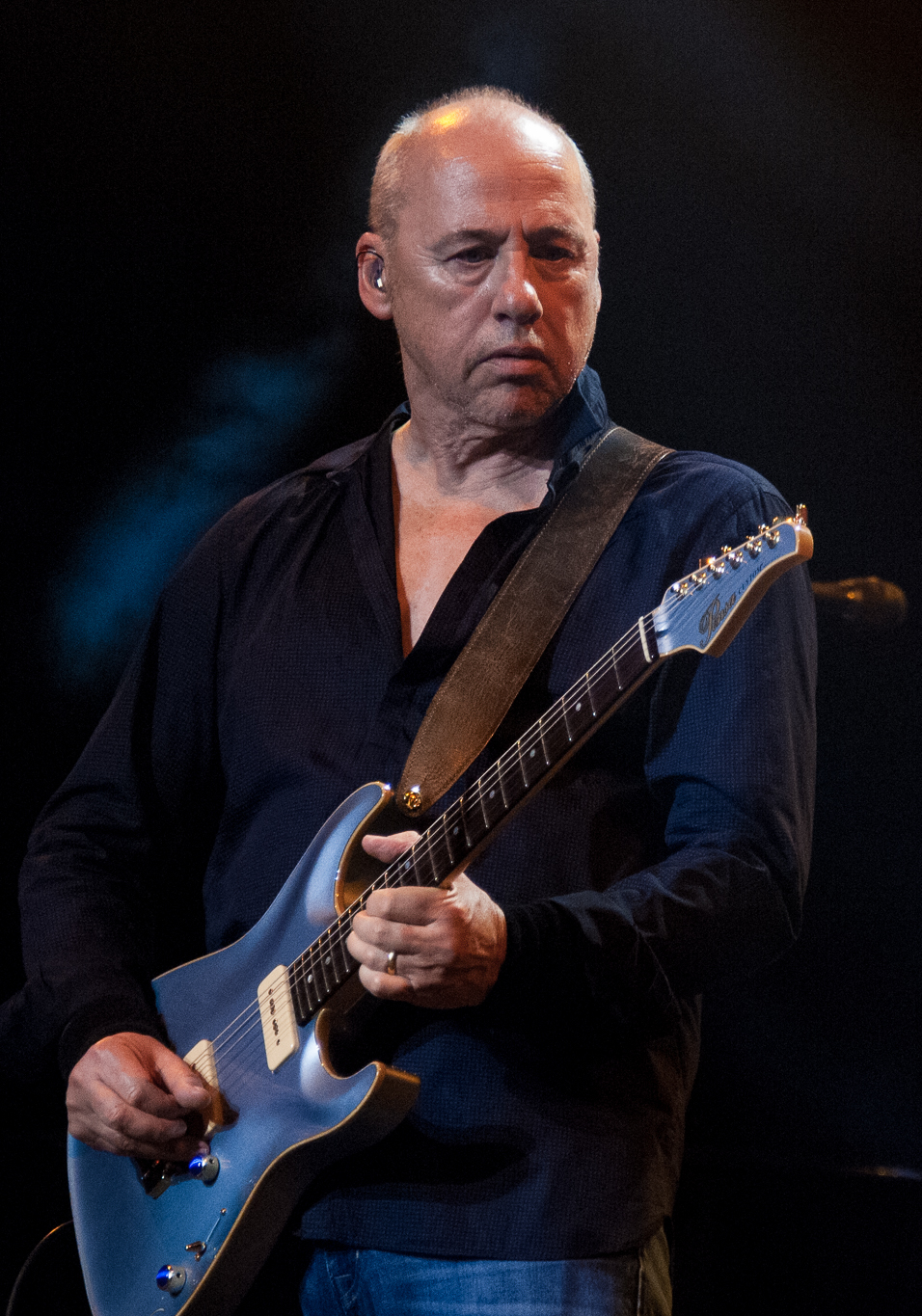
Mark Knopfler

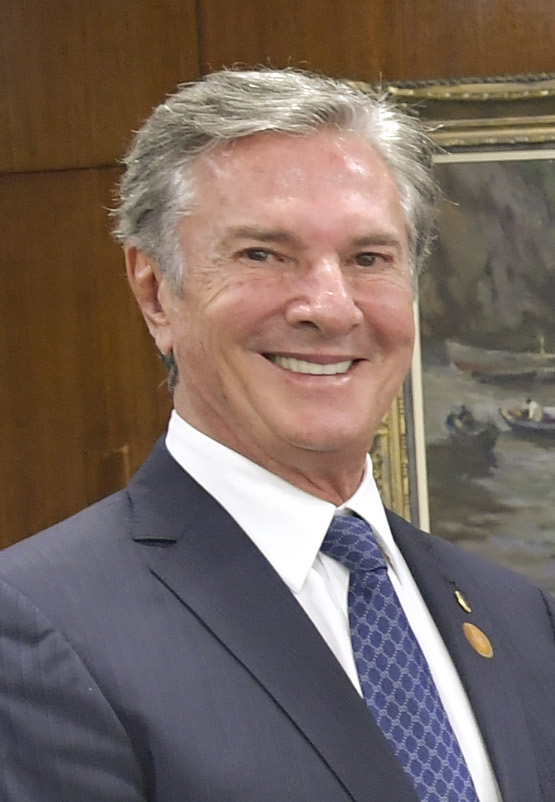
Fernando Collor de Mello

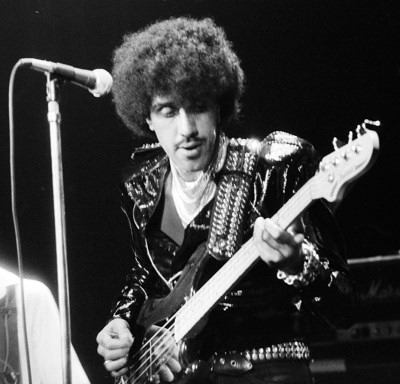
Phil Lynott

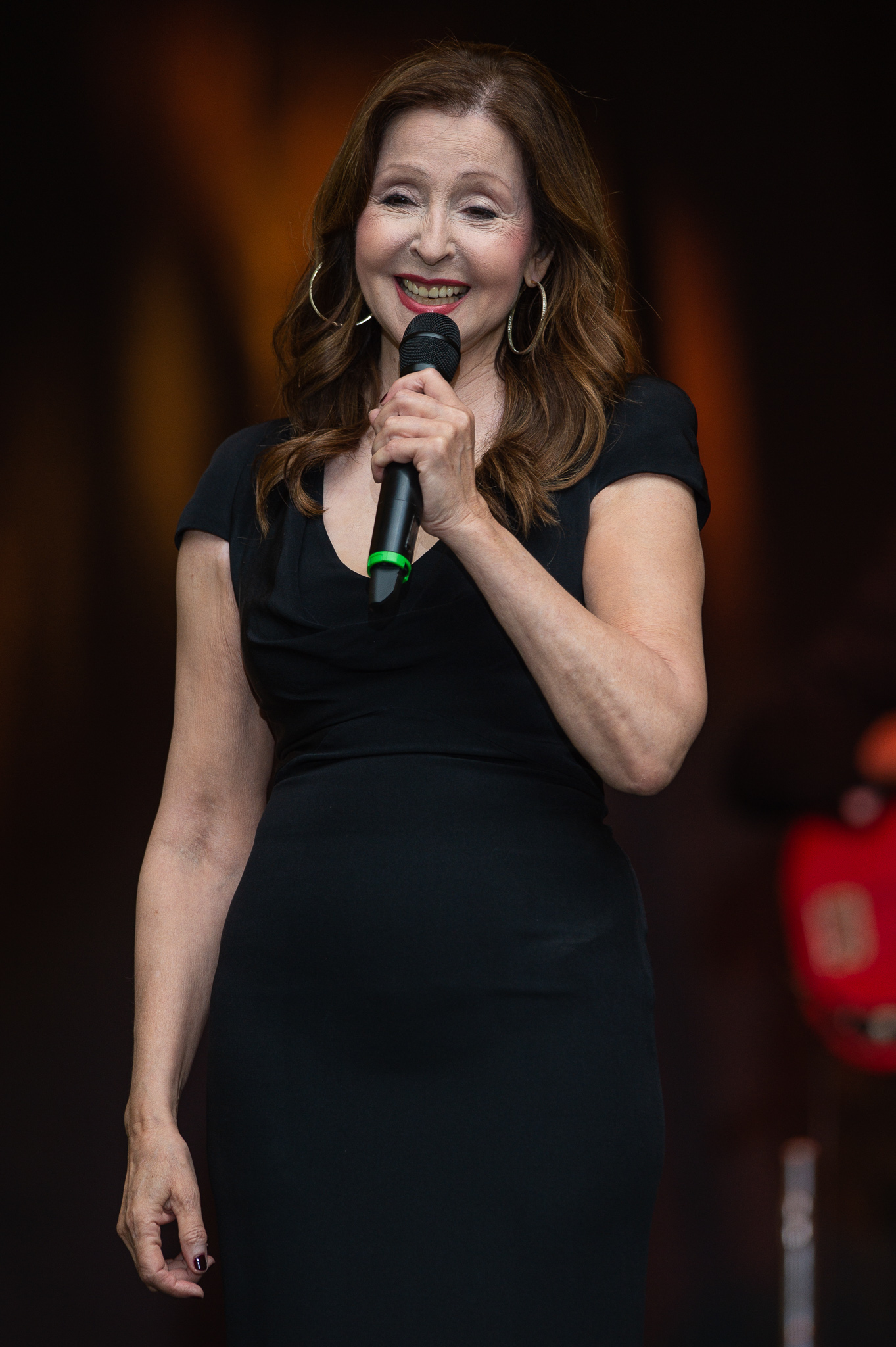
Vicky Leandros

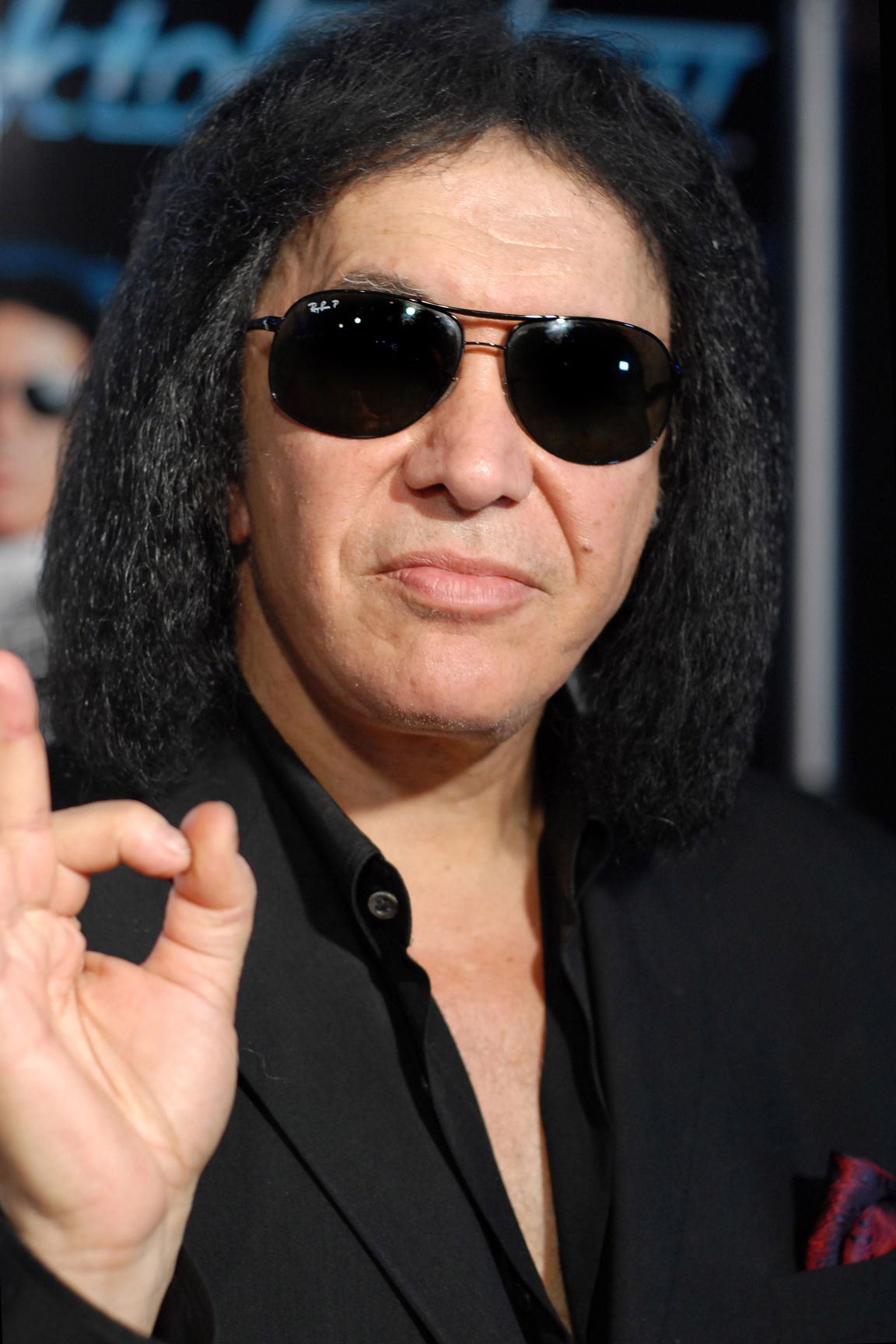
Gene Simmons

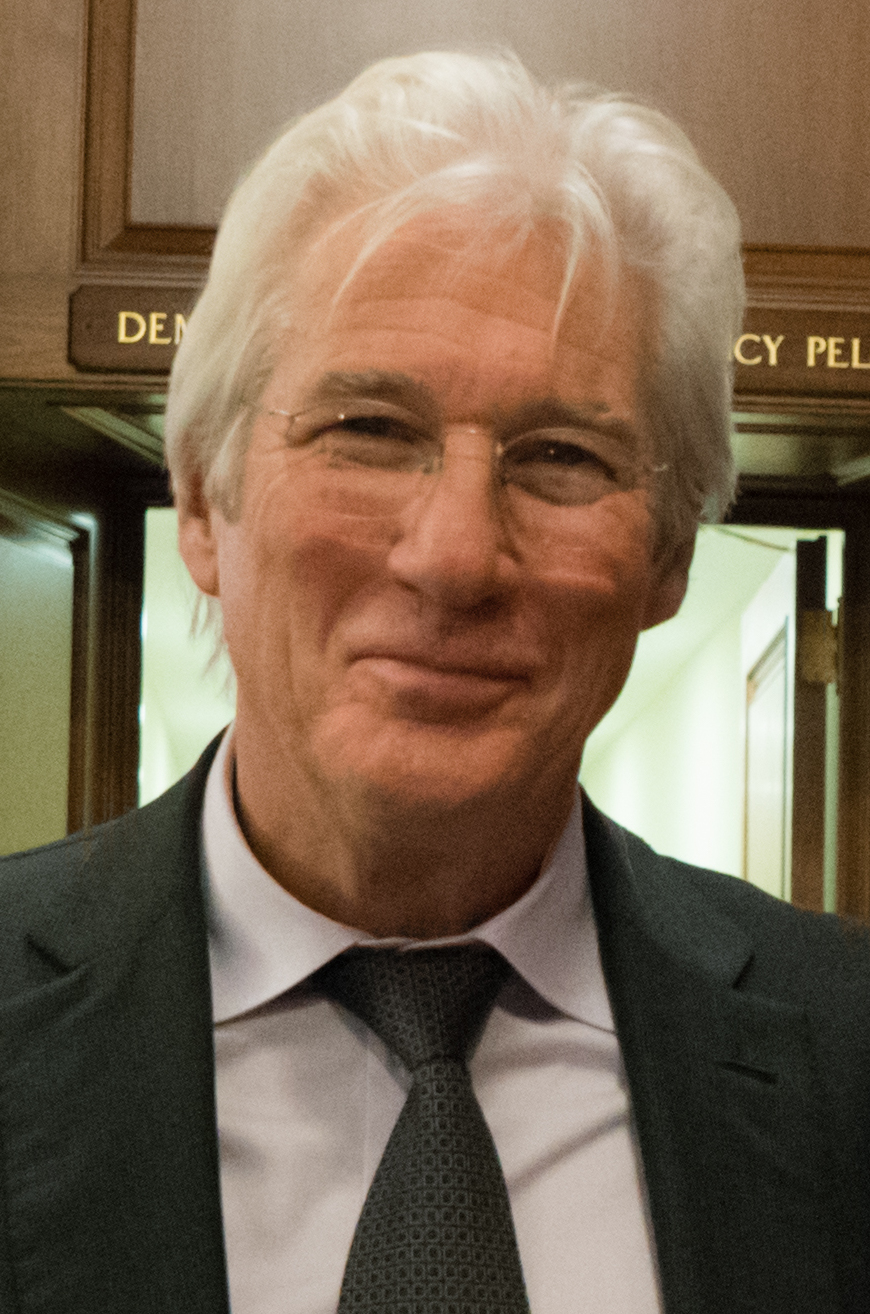
Richard Gere

- August 1 – Mugur Isărescu, 58th prime minister of Romania
- August 7 – Walid Jumblatt, leader of the Lebanese Druze
- August 8 – Keith Carradine, American actor
- August 11 – Ian Charleson, Scottish actor (d. 1990)
- August 12
  - Fernando Collor de Mello, 32nd president of Brazil
  - Mark Knopfler, British rock guitarist
- August 13 – Philippe Petit, French high-wire artist
- August 14 – Morten Olsen, Danish football player, manager
- August 15 – Beverly Burns, American pilot, first woman to captain a Boeing 747
- August 17 – Sue Draheim, American fiddler (d. 2013)
- August 18 – Don Koivisto, American politician from Michigan
- August 20 – Phil Lynott, Irish rock musician (d. 1986)
- August 21
  - Loretta Devine, African-American actress
  - Keetie van Oosten-Hage, Dutch cyclist
- August 23
  - Vicky Leandros, Greek singer
  - Shelley Long, American actress (Cheers)
  - Rick Springfield, Australian rock singer, actor
- August 24 – Anna Lee Fisher, American astronaut, chemist and physician
- August 25
  - Willy Rey, Dutch-Canadian model (d. 1973)
  - Martin Amis, English novelist (d. 2023)
  - Gene Simmons, Israeli-American rock musician (Kiss)
- August 26 – Leon Redbone, Canadian-American singer, songwriter, actor, voice actor, and guitarist (d. 2019)
- August 28 – Svetislav Pešić, Serbian basketball player, coach
- August 30 – Peter Maffay, German singer
- August 31
  - Richard Gere, American actor
  - H. David Politzer, American physicist, Nobel Prize laureate

=== September ===
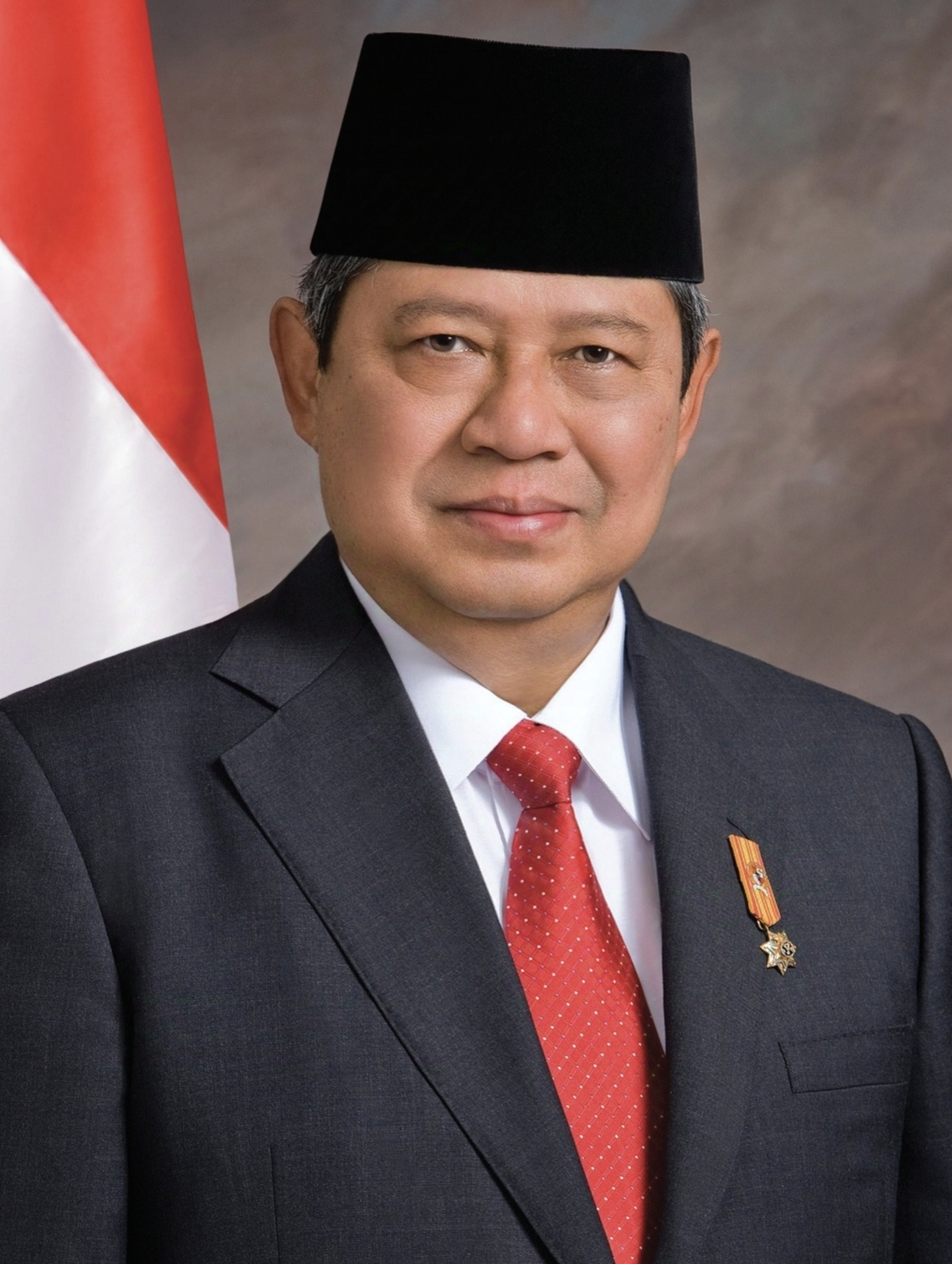
Susilo Bambang Yudhoyono

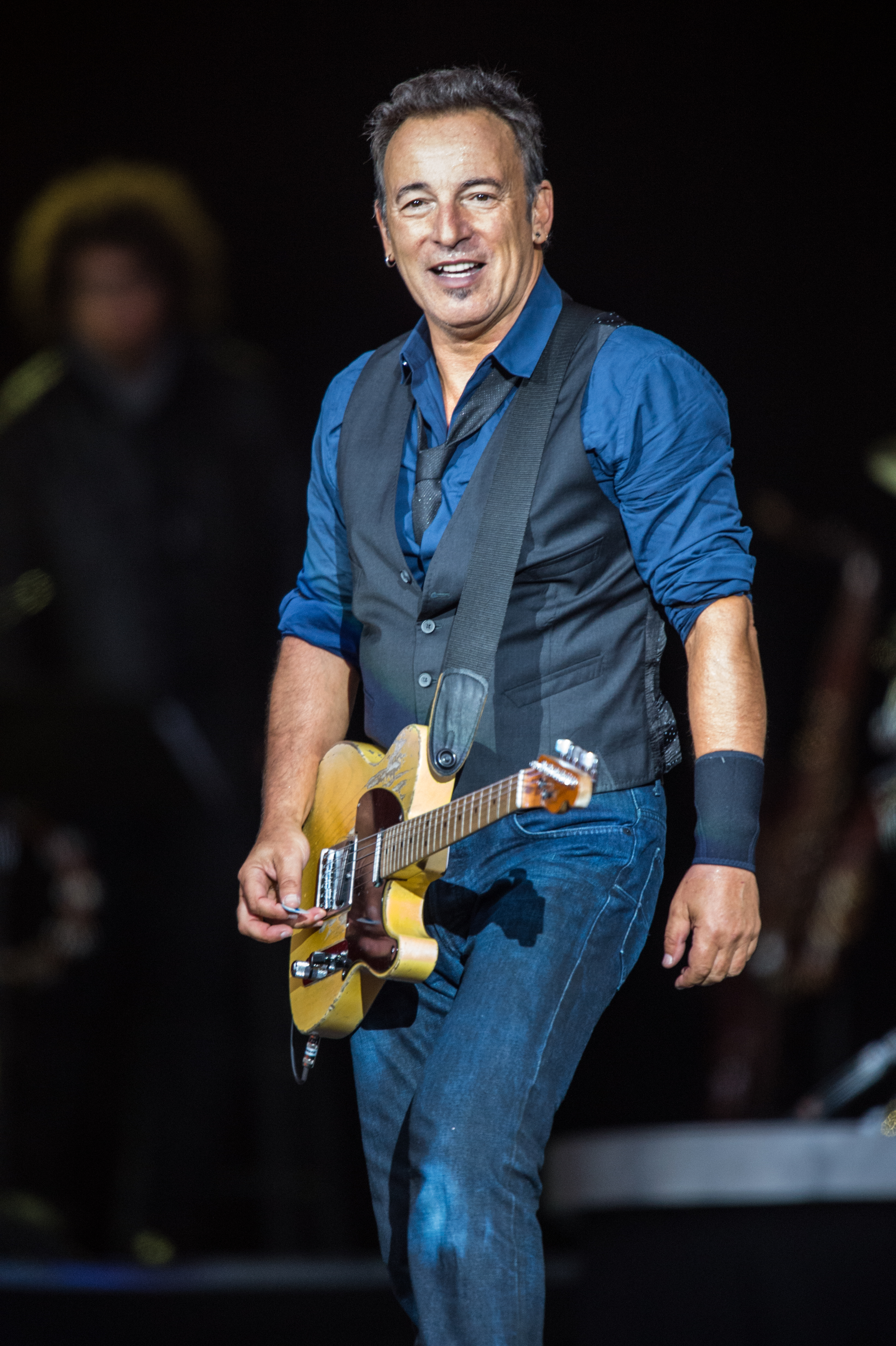
Bruce Springsteen

- September 1
  - Fidel Castro Díaz-Balart, Cuban nuclear physicist, government official (d. 2018)
  - Tan Soo Khoon, former speaker of the Parliament of Singapore
- September 9
  - John Curry, British figure skater (d. 1994)
  - Alain Mosconi, French swimmer, Olympic medalist and previous world record holder
  - Daniel Pipes, American historian, writer, and commentator
  - Susilo Bambang Yudhoyono, 6th president of Indonesia
- September 14 – Eikichi Yazawa, Japanese singer
- September 16
  - Ed Begley Jr., American actor, environmentalist (St. Elsewhere)
  - Doreen Chen, Jamaican politician
  - Chrisye, Indonesian singer (d. 2007)
- September 17 – Didith Reyes, Filipina singer (d. 2008)
- September 18
  - Mo Mowlam, British politician (d. 2005)
  - Peter Shilton, English goalkeeper
- September 19
  - Twiggy, English model
  - Richard Rogler, German Kabarett artist, professor of Kabarett at the University of the Arts in Berlin
- September 23 – Bruce Springsteen, American singer, songwriter (Born in the USA)
- September 25
  - Inshan Ali, West Indian cricketer (d. 1995)
  - Pedro Almodóvar, Spanish filmmaker, director, screenwriter, producer, and actor
- September 26 – Jane Smiley, American novelist
- September 27 – Jahn Teigen, Norwegian singer (d. 2020)

=== October ===
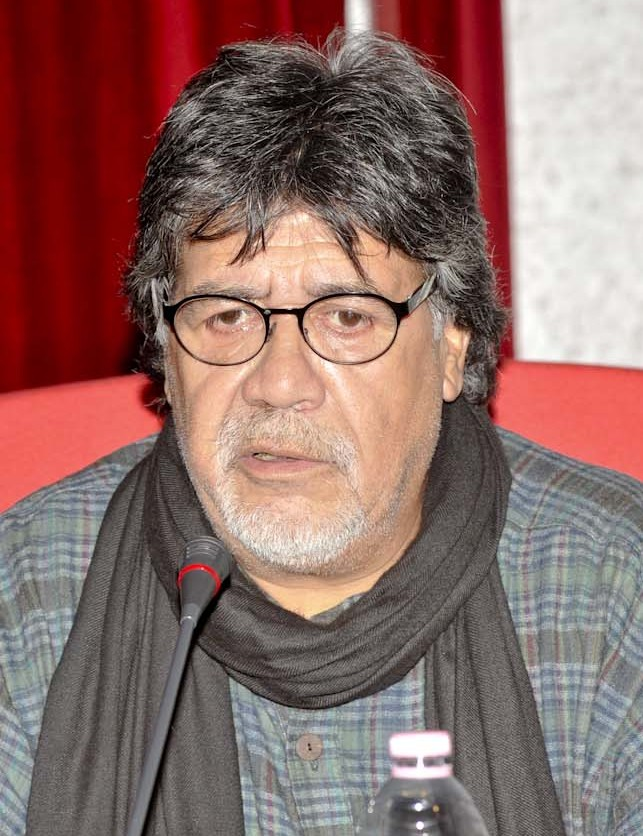
Luis Sepúlveda

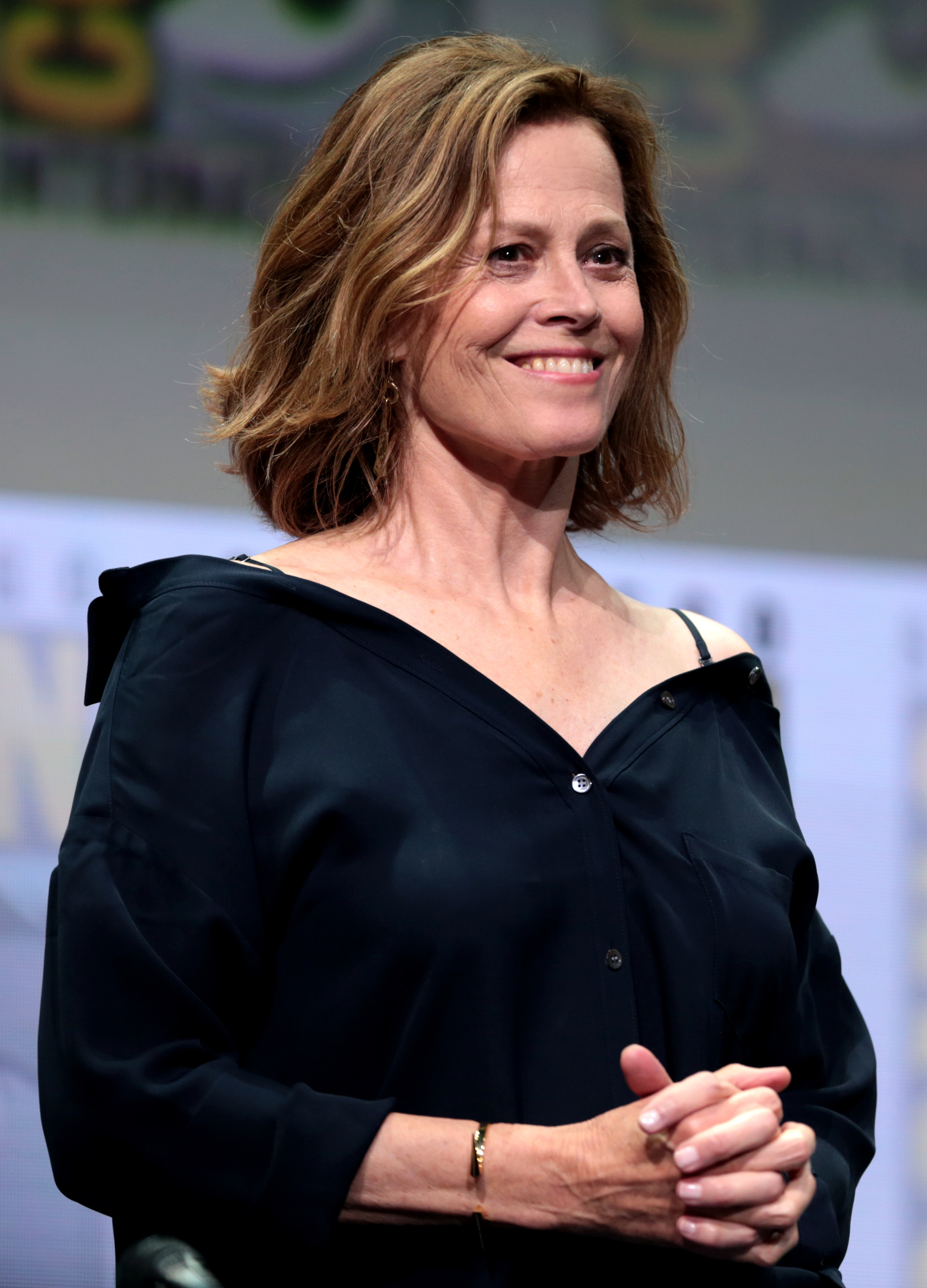
Sigourney Weaver

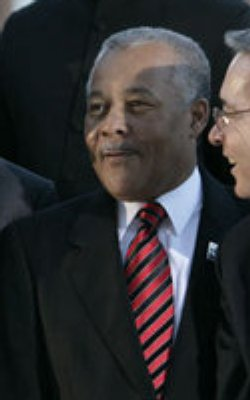
Owen Arthur

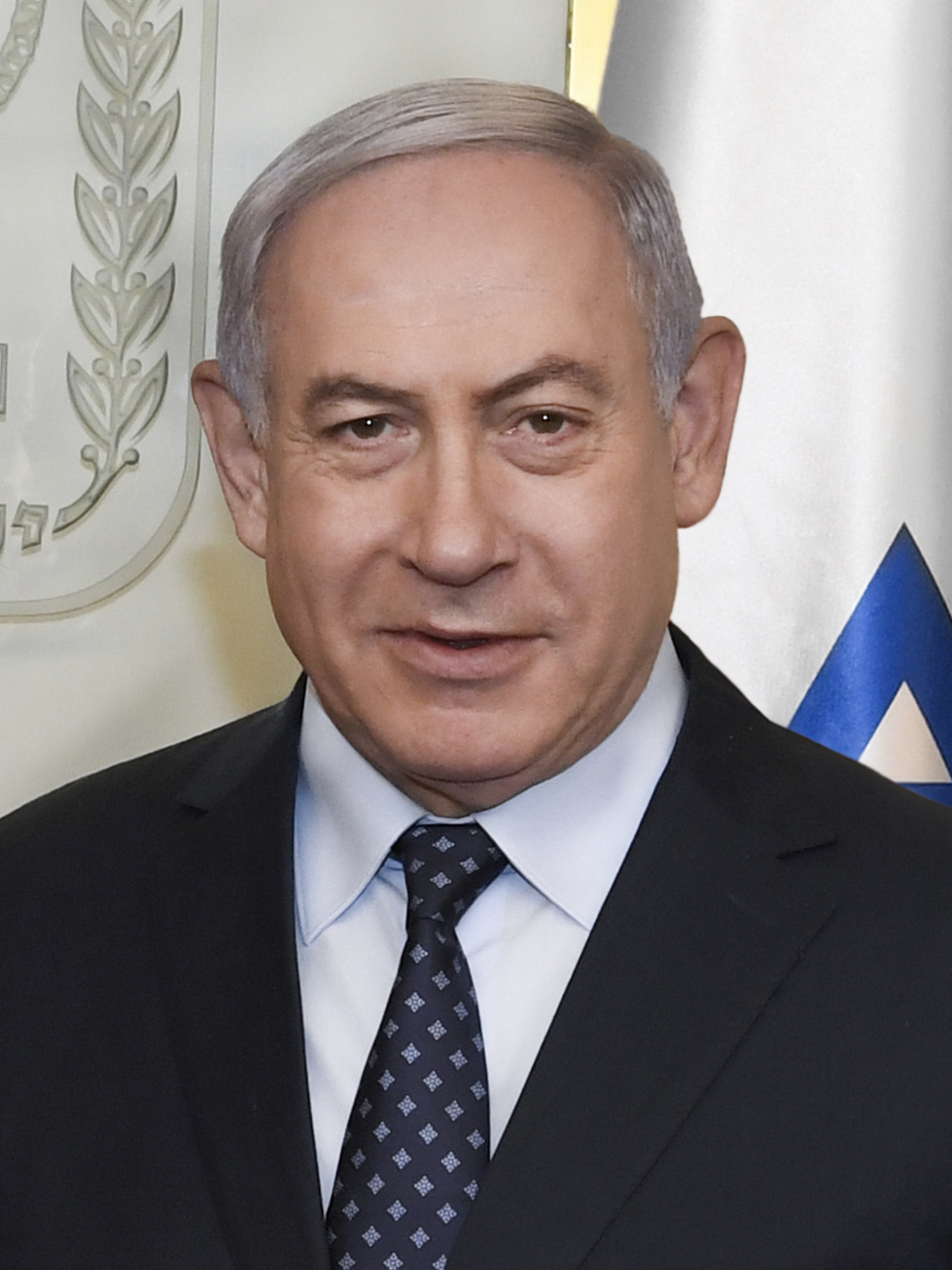
Benjamin Netanyahu

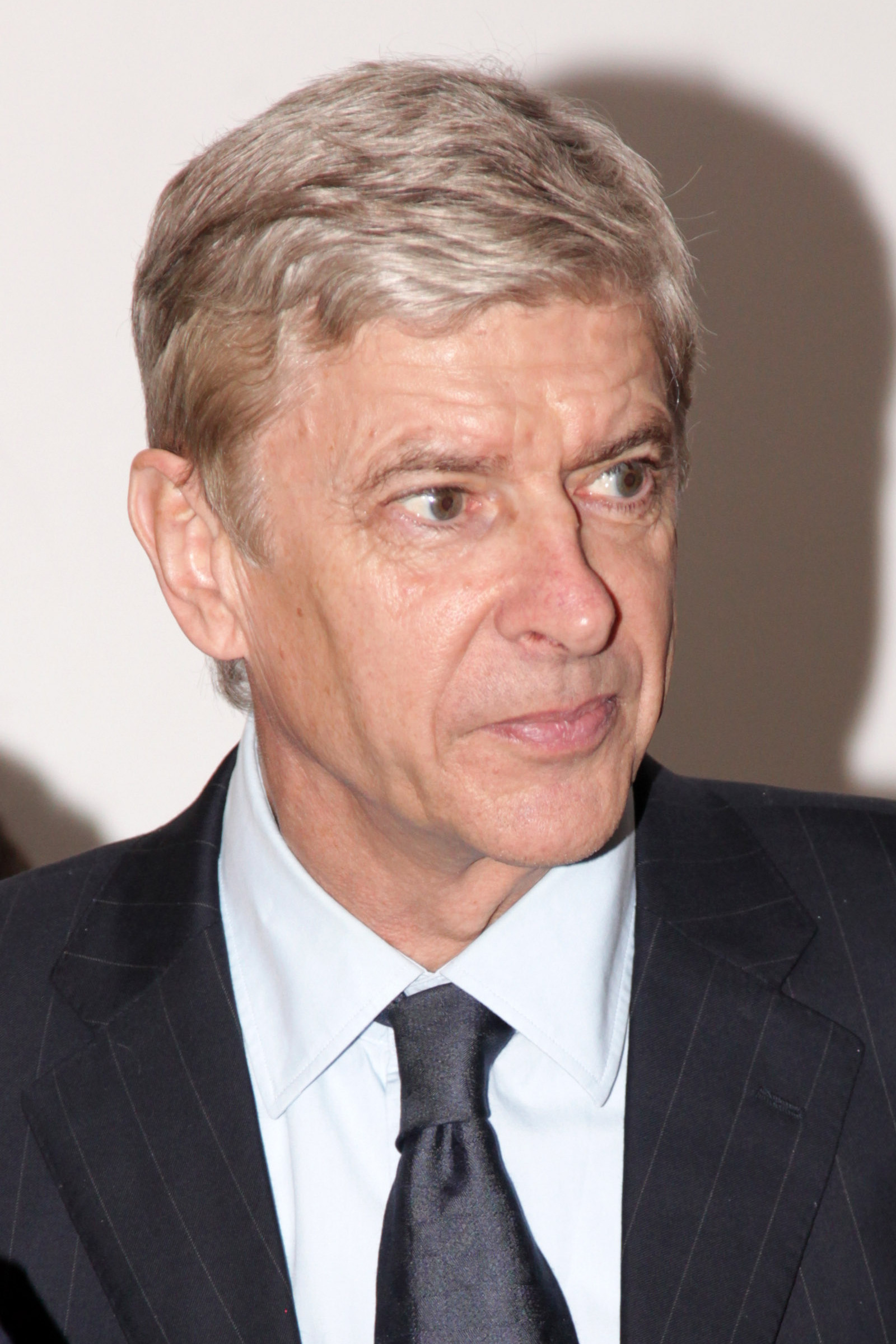
Arsène Wenger

- October 1 – Su Chi, Taiwanese politician
- October 2 – Annie Leibovitz, American photographer
- October 3 – Svika Pick, Israeli musician
- October 4
  - Armand Assante, American actor (Gotti)
  - Lindsey Buckingham, American musician
  - Luis Sepúlveda, Chilean writer and journalist (d. 2020)
- October 8
  - Chris Dobson, British chemist (d. 2019)
  - Sigourney Weaver, American actress
- October 10 – Jessica Harper, American actress, producer
- October 12 – Carlos the Jackal, Venezuelan-born international terrorist
- October 15 – Tanya Roberts, American actress (d. 2021)
- October 17
  - Owen Arthur, 5th prime minister of Barbados (d. 2020)
  - Dean Shek, Hong Kong actor (d. 2021)
- October 20 – Valeriy Borzov, Ukrainian athlete
- October 21 – Benjamin Netanyahu, 2-time prime minister of Israel
- October 22 – Arsène Wenger, French football (soccer) manager
- October 26 – Antonio Carpio, Filipino Supreme Court jurist
- October 28 – Caitlyn Jenner, American transgender track and field athlete, reality star
- October 29 – Vedrana Rudan, Croatian journalist, novelist and social commentator (d. 2026)
- October 30 – Pramod Mahajan, Indian politician, strategist (d. 2006)

=== November ===
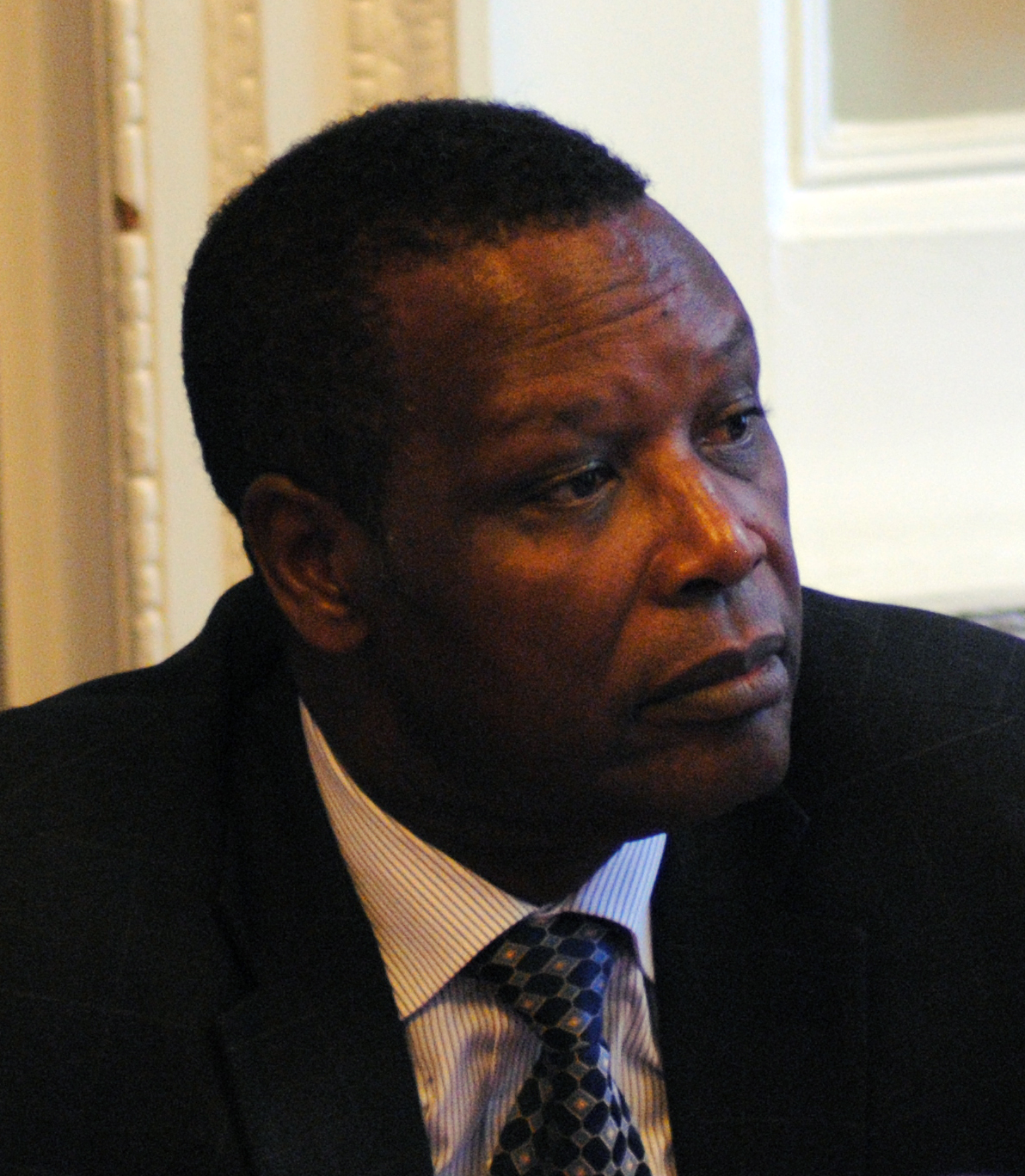
Pierre Buyoya

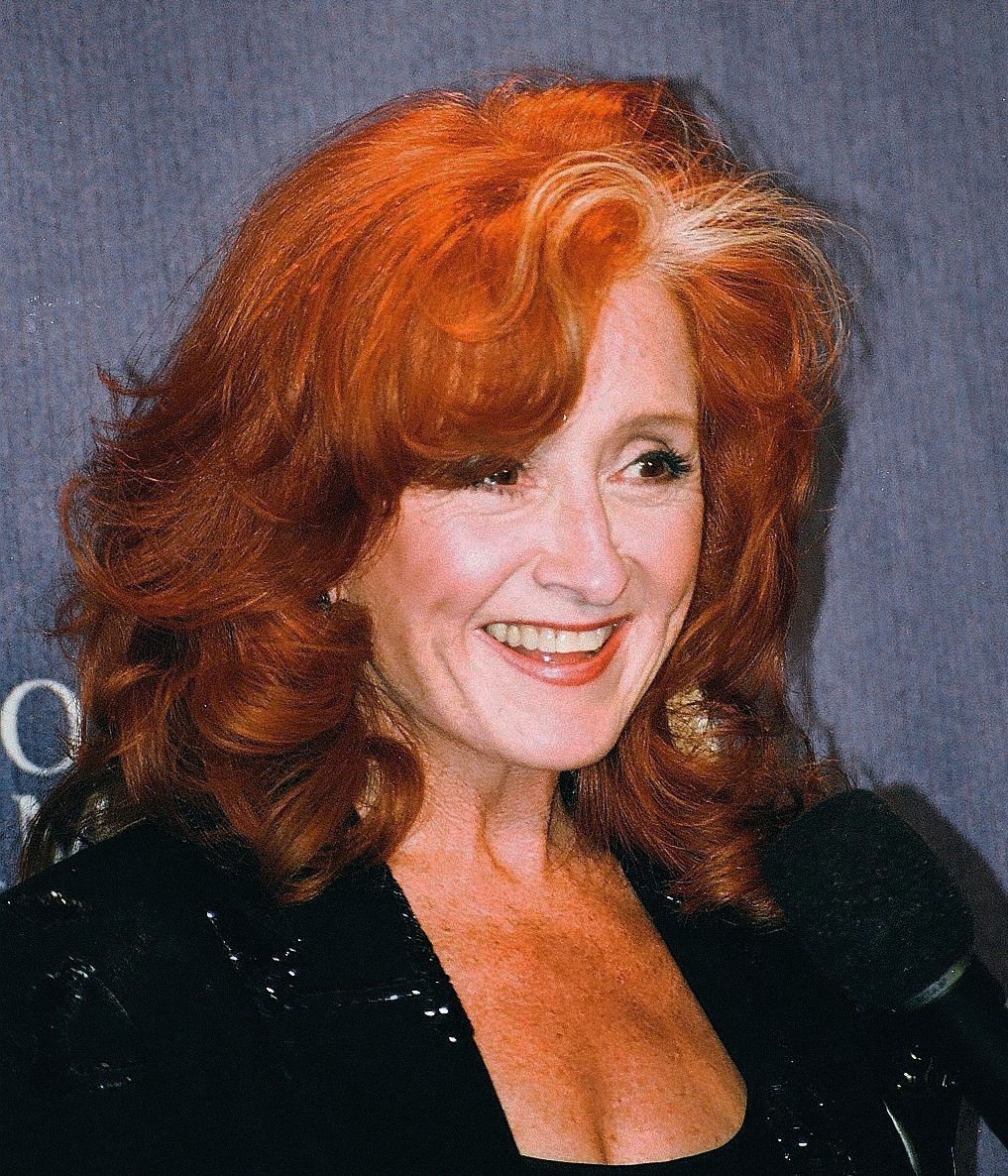
Bonnie Raitt

- November 1
  - Jeannie Berlin, American film actress
  - David Foster, Canadian musician, record producer, composer, singer, songwriter and arranger
- November 3
  - Larry Holmes, African-American boxer
  - Anna Wintour, British-American fashion journalist, editor-in-chief of the magazine Vogue
- November 5 – Armin Shimerman, American actor
- November 7
  - Aiswarya, Queen of Nepal (d. 2001)
  - Guillaume Faye, French journalist and writer (d. 2019)
  - Judy Tenuta, American comedian (d. 2022)
- November 8 – Bonnie Raitt, American singer, guitarist
- November 11 – Ismail Petra of Kelantan, sultan of Kelantan (d. 2019)
- November 14 – Paola Balducci, Italian politician, lawyer
- November 17
  - John Boehner, Speaker of the United States House of Representatives
  - Nguyễn Tấn Dũng, Vietnamese politician
- November 18
  - Ahmed Zaki, Egyptian actor (d. 2005)
  - Enrica Bonaccorti, Italian actress and television presenter (d. 2026)
- November 19 – Ahmad Rashad, American football player and sportscaster
- November 21 – Ignazio Visco, Italian economist, Governor of the Bank of Italy
- November 22 – Shaun Garnett, English footballer, coach
- November 23 – Marcia Griffiths, Jamaican singer
- November 24 – Pierre Buyoya, former president of Burundi (d. 2020)
- November 25
  - Kerry O'Keeffe, Australian cricketer, commentator
  - GT Devegowda, Indian politician
- November 26 – Shlomo Artzi, Israeli singer
- November 28
  - Alexander Godunov, Russian-born dancer, actor (d. 1995)
  - Paul Shaffer, Canadian-American musician
  - Siringan Gubat, Malaysian politician (d. 2018)
- November 29
  - Jerry Lawler, American professional wrestler and commentator
  - Stan Rogers, Canadian musician (d. 1983)
  - Garry Shandling, American comedian (d. 2016)

=== December ===
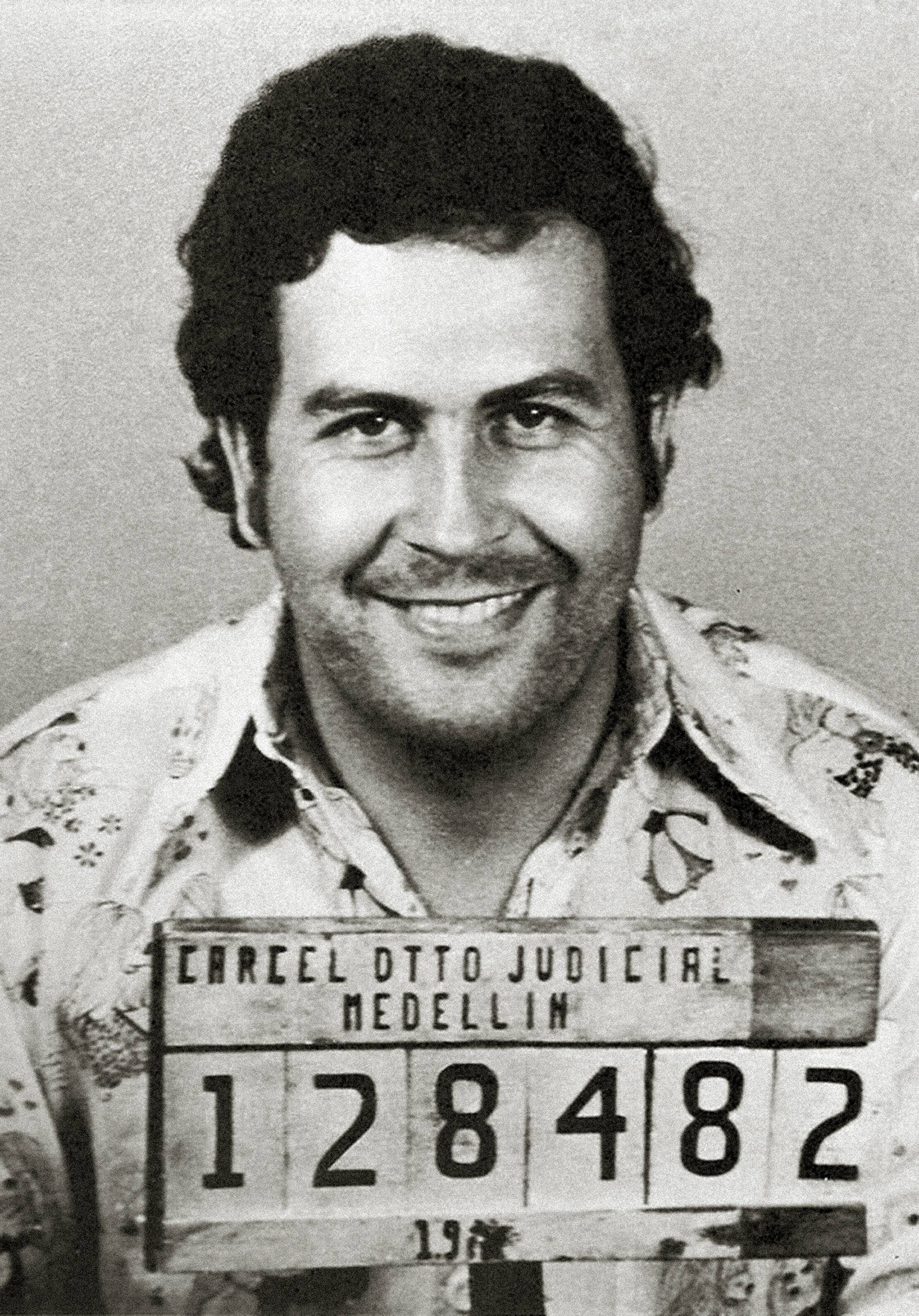
Pablo Escobar

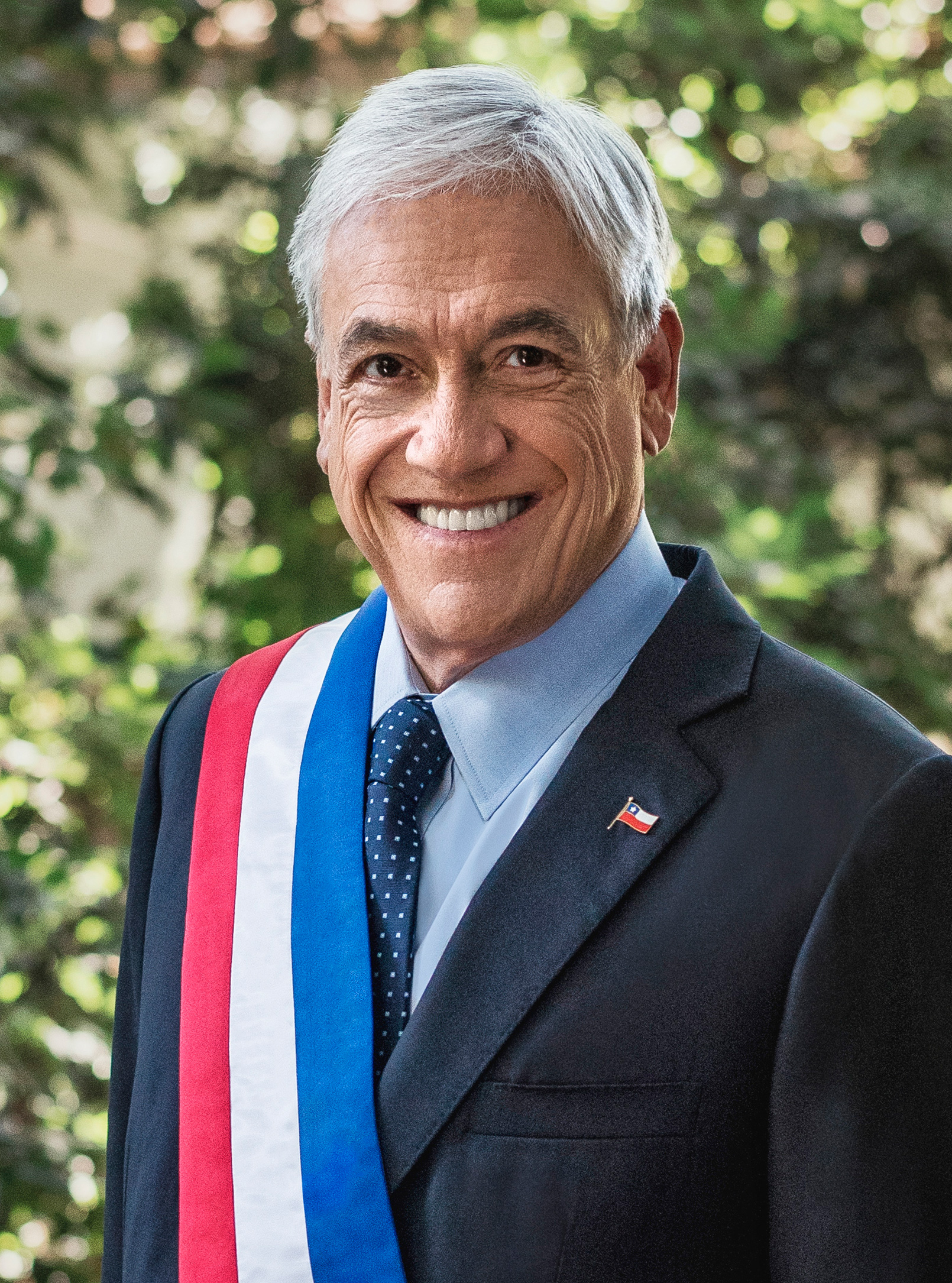
Sebastián Piñera

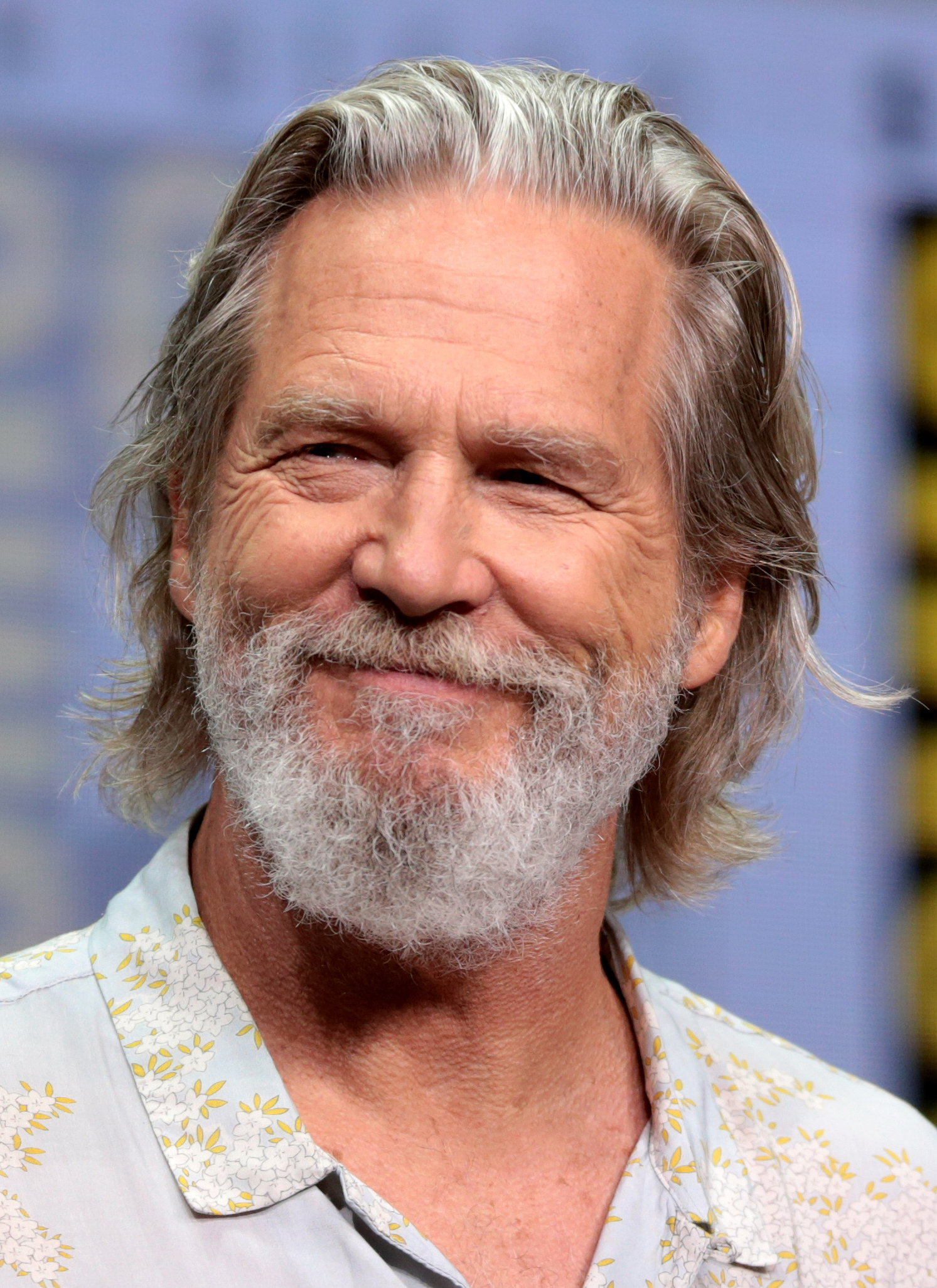
Jeff Bridges

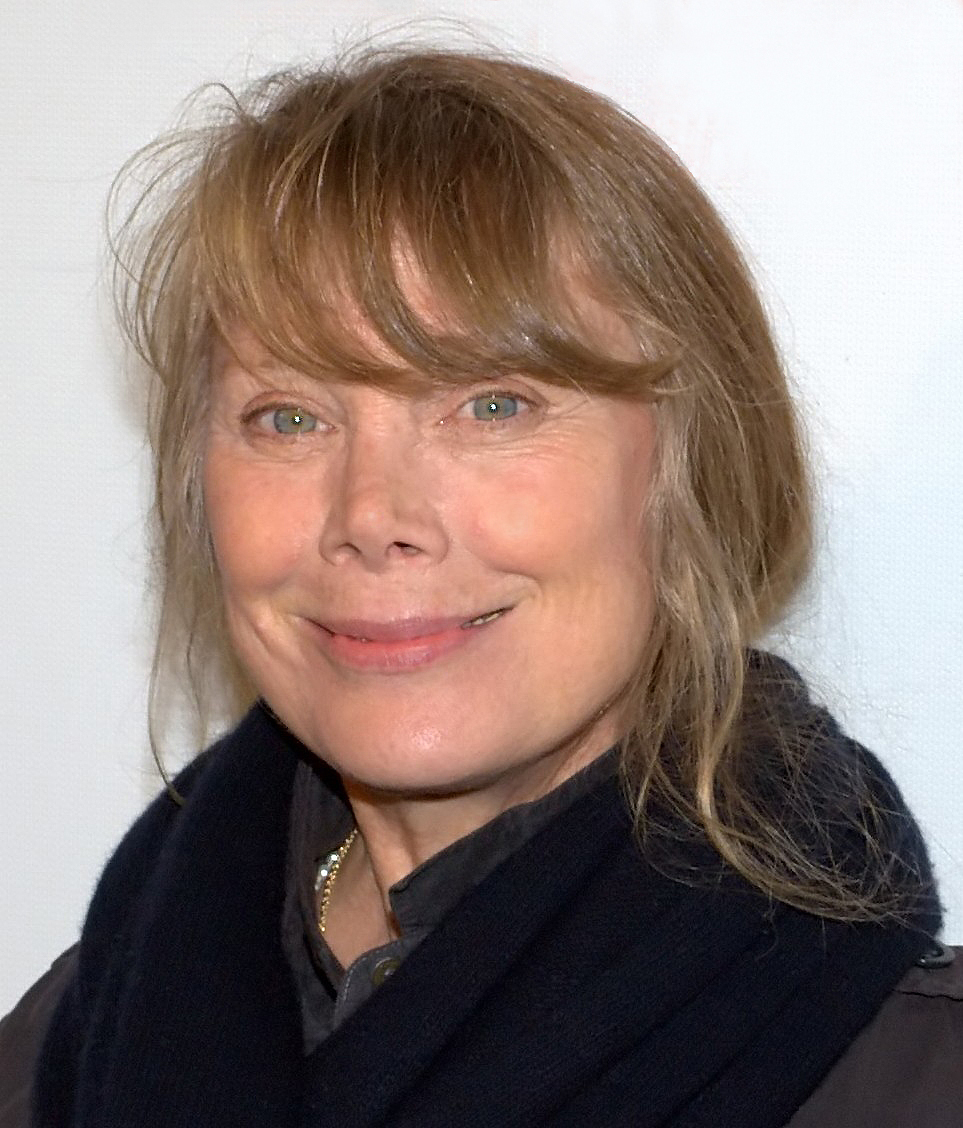
Sissy Spacek

- December 1
  - Pablo Escobar, Colombian drug lord (k. 1993)
  - Sebastián Piñera, Chilean businessman, politician and 36th and 38th president of Chile (d. 2024)
- December 3
  - John Akii-Bua, Ugandan hurdler (d. 1997)
  - Heather Menzies, Canadian-American actress (d. 2017)
- December 4
  - Jeff Bridges, American actor
  - Pamela Stephenson, New Zealand-born comedian, actress, and singer
- December 5 – Bruce E. Melnick, American astronaut
- December 7
  - James Rivière, Italian jeweler, designer
  - Tom Waits, American singer, composer and actor
  - Cathy Wayne, Australian pop entertainer (d. 1969)
- December 8
  - Mary Gordon, American writer
  - Michelle Schatzman, French analyst and mathematician (d. 2010)
- December 11 – Boris Shcherbakov, Russian-Soviet film actor
- December 12 – Bill Nighy, British actor
- December 13
  - Robert Lindsay, English actor
  - Tom Verlaine, American rock singer, guitarist (d. 2023)
- December 14 – Bill Buckner, American baseball player (d. 2019)
- December 15
  - Don Johnson, American actor (Miami Vice)
  - Abdul Karim Kabariti, Prime Minister of Jordan
- December 16
  - Billy Gibbons, American guitarist (ZZ Top)
  - Ieremia Tabai, first president of Kiribati
- December 17
  - Dušan Mitošević, Serbian football player, manager (d. 2018)
  - Paul Rodgers, British rock singer
- December 18
  - David A. Johnston, American volcanologist (d. 1980)
  - Blaze Foley, American country singer-songwriter (d. 1989)
- December 19
  - Carlos Gomes Júnior, Bissau-Guinean politician
  - Sebastian, Danish musician
- December 21 – Thomas Sankara, 2-Time President of Burkina Faso (d. 1987)
- December 22
  - Michael Bacon, American singer-songwriter
  - Maurice Gibb, Manx-born British rock musician (Bee Gees) (d. 2003)
  - Robin Gibb, Manx-born British rock musician (Bee Gees) (d. 2012)
- December 25
  - Simone Bittencourt de Oliveira, Brazilian singer
  - Sissy Spacek, American actress
  - Manny Mori, president of Micronesia
  - Nawaz Sharif, Pakistani prime minister
- December 26 – José Ramos-Horta, President of East Timor, recipient of the Nobel Peace Prize
- December 27 – Klaus Fischer, German footballer
- December 29 – Syed Kirmani, Indian cricketer
- December 31 – Ellen Datlow, American science fiction writer

=== Date unknown ===
- Michael Houghton, British-born virologist, recipient of the Nobel Prize in Physiology or Medicine
- Bakri Hassan Saleh, 12th prime minister of Sudan

== Deaths ==
=== January ===
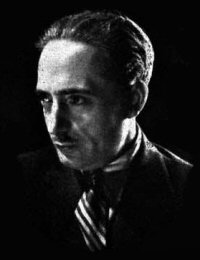
Gennaro Righelli

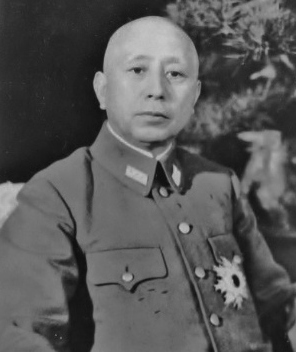
Yoshijirō Umezu

- January 6
  - Victor Fleming, American director (b. 1889)
  - Gennaro Righelli, Italian actor, director and screenwriter (b. 1886)
- January 7
  - José Ramos Preto, Portuguese jurist, politician and 75th prime minister of Portugal (b. 1870)
  - Suehiko Shiono, Japanese lawyer, politician and cabinet minister (b. 1880)
- January 8 – Yoshijirō Umezu, Japanese general (b. 1882)
- January 9
  - Martin Grabmann, German Catholic priest, mediaevalist and historian (b. 1875)
  - Tommy Handley, British radio comedian (b. 1892)
  - Tom Longboat, Canadian Olympic runner (b. 1887)
- January 10 – Erich von Drygalski, German geographer (b. 1865)
- January 11 – Nelson Doubleday, American publisher (b. 1889)
- January 13 – Eduardo Barron, Spanish engineer, pilot (b. 1888)
- January 14
  - Juan Bielovucic, Peruvian aviator (b. 1889)
  - Harry Stack Sullivan, American psychiatrist (b. 1892)
  - Joaquín Turina, Spanish composer (b. 1882)
- January 15 – Charles Ponzi, Italian-born American con man (b. 1882)
- January 19 – William Wright, American actor (b. 1911)
- January 21 – Joseph Cawthorn, American actor (b. 1868)
- January 22
  - Henry Mond, 2nd Baron Melchett, British industrialist, politician (b. 1898)
  - Henry Slocum, American tennis player (b. 1862)
- January 23 – Erich Klossowski, German-born Polish historian, painter (b. 1875)
- January 28 – Jean-Pierre Wimille, French race car driver (b. 1908)
- January 31 – Henri De Vries, Dutch actor (b. 1864)

=== February ===
- February 1 – Herbert Stothart, American composer (b. 1885)
- February 2
  - Pedro Paulo Bruno, Brazilian painter, singer, poet and landscaper (b. 1888)
  - Theodoros Natsinas, Greek teacher (b. 1872)
- February 3 – Carlos Obligado, Argentine poet, critic and writer (b. 1889)
- February 6
  - Hiroaki Abe, Japanese admiral (b. 1889)
  - Ulrich Greifelt, German SS general of police (b. 1896)
- February 10
  - Charles Vane-Tempest-Stewart, 7th Marquess of Londonderry, British politician (b. 1878)
  - Francesco Ticciati, Italian composer, pianist, teacher and lecturer (b. 1893)
- February 11 – Giovanni Zenatello, Italian opera singer (b. 1876)
- February 12 – Hassan al-Banna, Egyptian founder of the Muslim Brotherhood (b. 1906) (assassinated)
- February 14 – Fernand Desprès, French shoemaker, anarchist, journalist and activist (b. 1879)
- February 15
  - Charles L. Bartholomew, American cartoonist (b. 1869)
  - Patricia Ryan, British-born American actress (b. 1921)
- February 16 – Umberto Brunelleschi, Italian artist (b. 1879)
- February 18 – Niceto Alcalá-Zamora, Spanish lawyer, politician and 6th president of Spain (b. 1877)
- February 19 – Fidelio Ponce de León, Cuban painter (b. 1895)
- February 21 – Tan Malaka, Indonesian teacher, philosopher, founder of Struggle Union and Murba Party, guerilla and fighter (b. 1897)
- February 22 – Félix d'Herelle, French-Canadian microbiologist (b. 1873)
- February 25 – Juan Sinforiano Bogarín, Paraguayan clergyman, Roman Catholic archbishop (b. 1863)

=== March ===
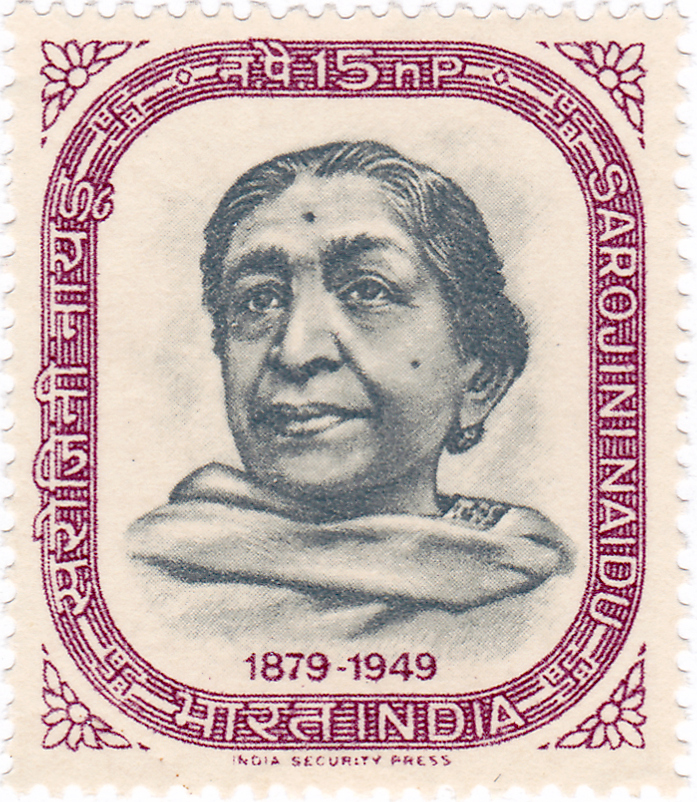
Sarojini Naidu

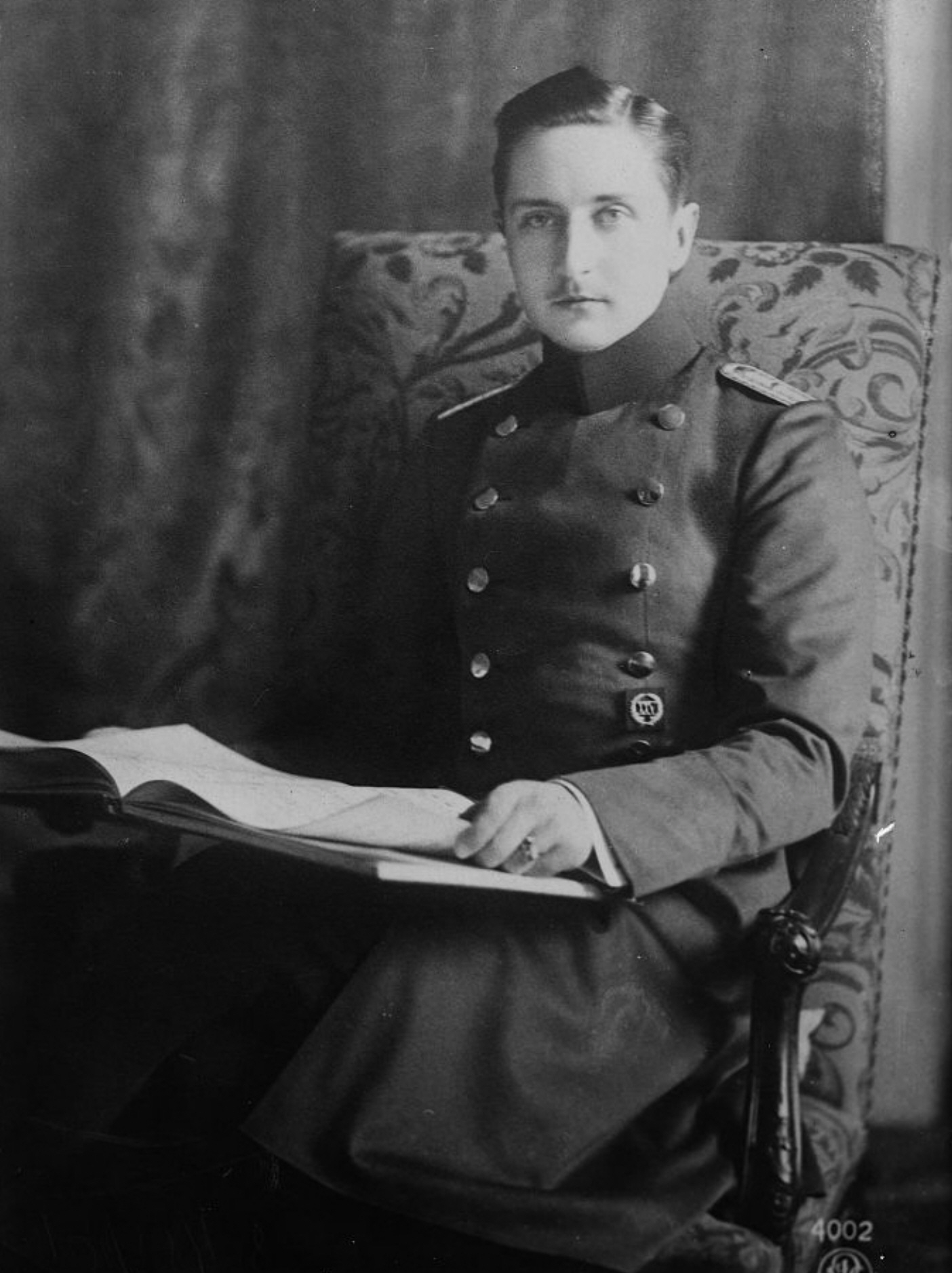
Prince August Wilhelm of Prussia

- March 2 – Sarojini Naidu, Indian independence activist, poet (b. 1879)
- March 3 – Carrie Ashton Johnson, American editor, author (b. 1863)
- March 4 – James Rowland Angell, American psychologist and educator (b. 1869)
- March 7 – Bradbury Robinson, American who threw the first forward pass in American football history (b. 1884)
- March 9 – Prince Philip of Bourbon-Two Sicilies (b. 1885)
- March 10 – Alphonse Hustache, French entomologist (b. 1872)
- March 11
  - Anastasios Charalambis, Greek general, interim prime minister of Greece (b. 1862)
  - Henri Giraud, French general (b. 1879)
  - Joan Lamote de Grignon, Spanish pianist, composer (b. 1872)
- March 12 – August Bier, German surgeon (b. 1861)
- March 15 – Gheorghe Brăescu, Romanian writer (b. 1871)
- March 16 – Leyland Hodgson, British-born American actor (b. 1892)
- March 17 – Felix Bressart, German-born American actor (b. 1892)
- March 19 – Sir James Somerville, British admiral (b. 1882)
- March 25
  - Prince August Wilhelm of Prussia (b. 1887)
  - Jack Kapp, president of the U.S. branch of Decca Records (b. 1901)
- March 27
  - Elisheva Bikhovski, Soviet-born Israeli poet, writer and translator (b. 1888)
- March 28
  - Alecu Constantinescu, Romanian trade unionist, journalist and militant (b. 1872)
  - Grigoraș Dinicu, Romanian composer (b. 1889)
- March 29
  - Inabata Katsutaro, Japanese industrialist, pioneer (b. 1862)
  - Helen Homans, American tennis player (b. 1877)
- March 30
  - Friedrich Bergius, German chemist, Nobel Prize laureate (b. 1884)
  - Prince Harald of Denmark (b. 1876)

=== April ===
- April 1 – Evelyn Owen, Australian gun designer (b. 1915)
- April 2
  - George Graves, British comic actor (b. 1876)
  - Chandra Mohan, Indian actor (b. 1906)
  - Francesco Pasinetti, Italian director, screenwriter (b. 1911)
- April 5 – Hugh Allan, Canadian politician (b. 1865)
- April 6 – Sir Seymour Hicks, British actor (b. 1871)
- April 7 – Mikhail Denisenko, Soviet general (b. 1899)
- April 8 – Santiago Alba y Bonifaz, Spanish lawyer, politician (b. 1872)
- April 13 – Bernardo Ortiz de Montellano, Mexican poet, literary critic, editor and teacher (b. 1899)
- April 15 – Wallace Beery, American actor (b. 1885)
- April 16 – Joseph Augustine Cushman, American geologist, paleontologist and foraminiferologist (b. 1881)
- April 18 – Will Hay, British comic actor (b. 1888)
- April 19
  - Guillermo Buitrago, Colombian composer (b. 1920)
  - Ulrich Salchow, Swedish figure skater (b. 1877)
- April 22 – Charles Middleton, American actor (b. 1874)
- April 27 – Patrick Lyons, Irish Roman Catholic prelate, reverend (b. 1875)
- April 28
  - Ponciano Bernardo, Filipino engineer, politician (b. 1905)
  - Aurora Quezon, First Lady of the Philippines (shot) (b. 1888)
  - Sir Robert Robertson, British chemist (b. 1869)
  - Hla Thaung, Burmese battalion leader
  - Sir Fabian Ware, British founder of the Imperial War Graves Commission (b. 1869)
- April 29
  - Johann Jakob Hess, Swiss Egyptologist, Assyriologist (b. 1866)
  - Kaarle Knuutila, Finnish farmer, politician (b. 1868)

=== May ===
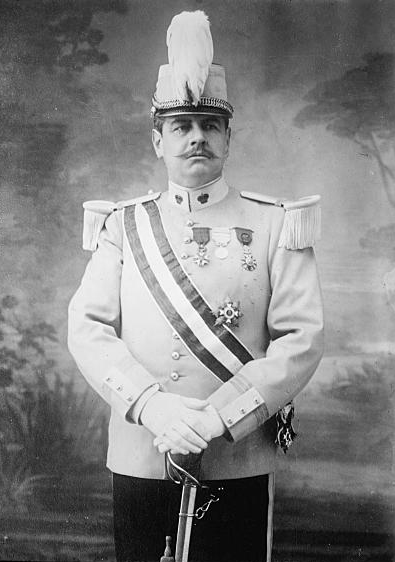
Prince Louis II of Monaco

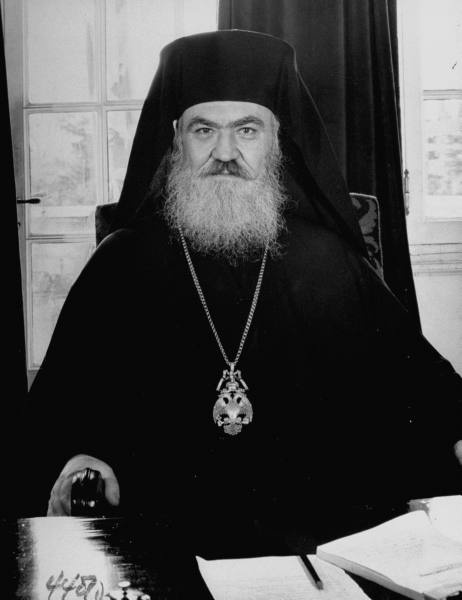
Damaskinos of Athens

- May 1
  - Josep Maria Jujol, Andorran architect (b. 1879)
  - Gheorghe Petrașcu, Romanian painter (b. 1872)
- May 4 – Valerio Bacigalupo, Italian goalkeeper (b. 1924)
- May 5 – Hideo Nagata, Japanese poet, playwright (b. 1885)
- May 6
  - Stanisław Grabski, Polish economist, politician (b. 1871)
  - Kunihiko Hashimoto, Japanese composer (b. 1904)
  - Maurice Maeterlinck, Belgian writer, Nobel Prize in Literature laureate (b. 1862)
- May 9 – Louis II, Prince of Monaco (b. 1870)
- May 19 – Paul Schultze-Naumburg, German architect, painter, publicist and politician (b. 1869)
- May 20 – Damaskinos of Athens, Archbishop of Athens, 57th prime minister of Greece (b. 1891)
- May 21 – Klaus Mann, German writer (b. 1906)
- May 22
  - James Forrestal, U.S. Secretary of Navy and Defense (b. 1892)
  - Hans Pfitzner, German composer (b. 1869)
- May 23 – Jan Frans De Boever, Belgian painter (b. 1872)
- May 27 – Robert Ripley, American creator of Ripley's Believe It or Not! (b. 1890)
- May 30 – Igor Belkovich, Soviet astronomer (b. 1904)
- Date unknown – Abd Allah Siraj, Prime Minister of Jordan (b. c. 1876)

=== June ===
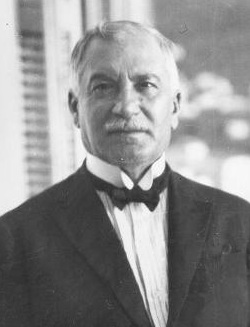
Themistoklis Sofoulis

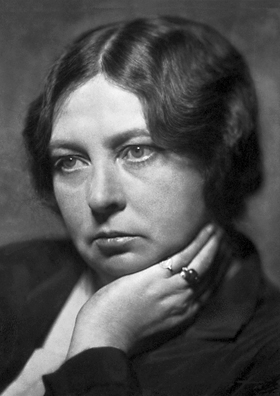
Sigrid Undset

- June 8
  - Naguib el-Rihani, Egyptian actor (b. 1889)
  - Virgilia Lütz, German Benedictine nun (b. 1869)
- June 9 – Maria Cebotari, Romanian soprano, actress (b. 1910)
- June 10
  - Filippo Silvestri, Italian entomologist (b. 1873)
  - Sigrid Undset, Norwegian writer, Nobel Prize laureate (b. 1882)
  - Carl Vaugoin, Austrian politician, 8th chancellor of Austria (b. 1873)
- June 11 – Giovanni Gioviale, Italian composer (b. 1885)
- June 12 – Maria Candida of the Eucharist, Italian Roman Catholic religious professed and blessed (b. 1884)
- June 14 – Russell Doubleday, American author, publisher (b. 1872)
- June 22 – Robert Boudrioz, French screenwriter, director (b. 1887)
- June 24 – Themistoklis Sofoulis, Greek politician, 3-time Prime Minister of Greece (b. 1860)

=== July ===
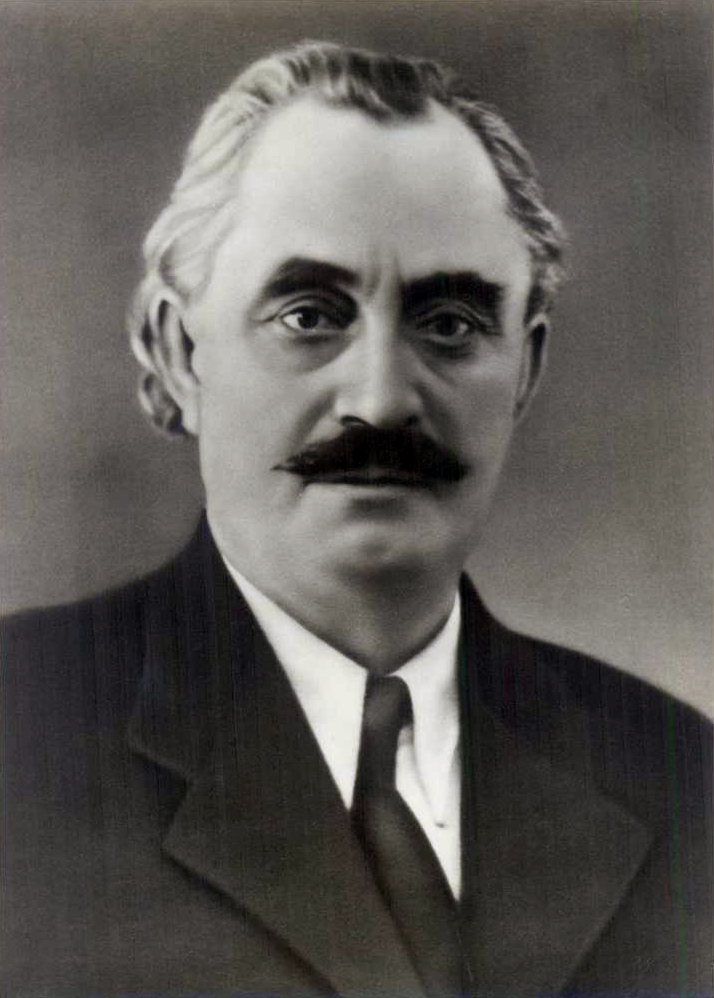
Georgi Dimitrov

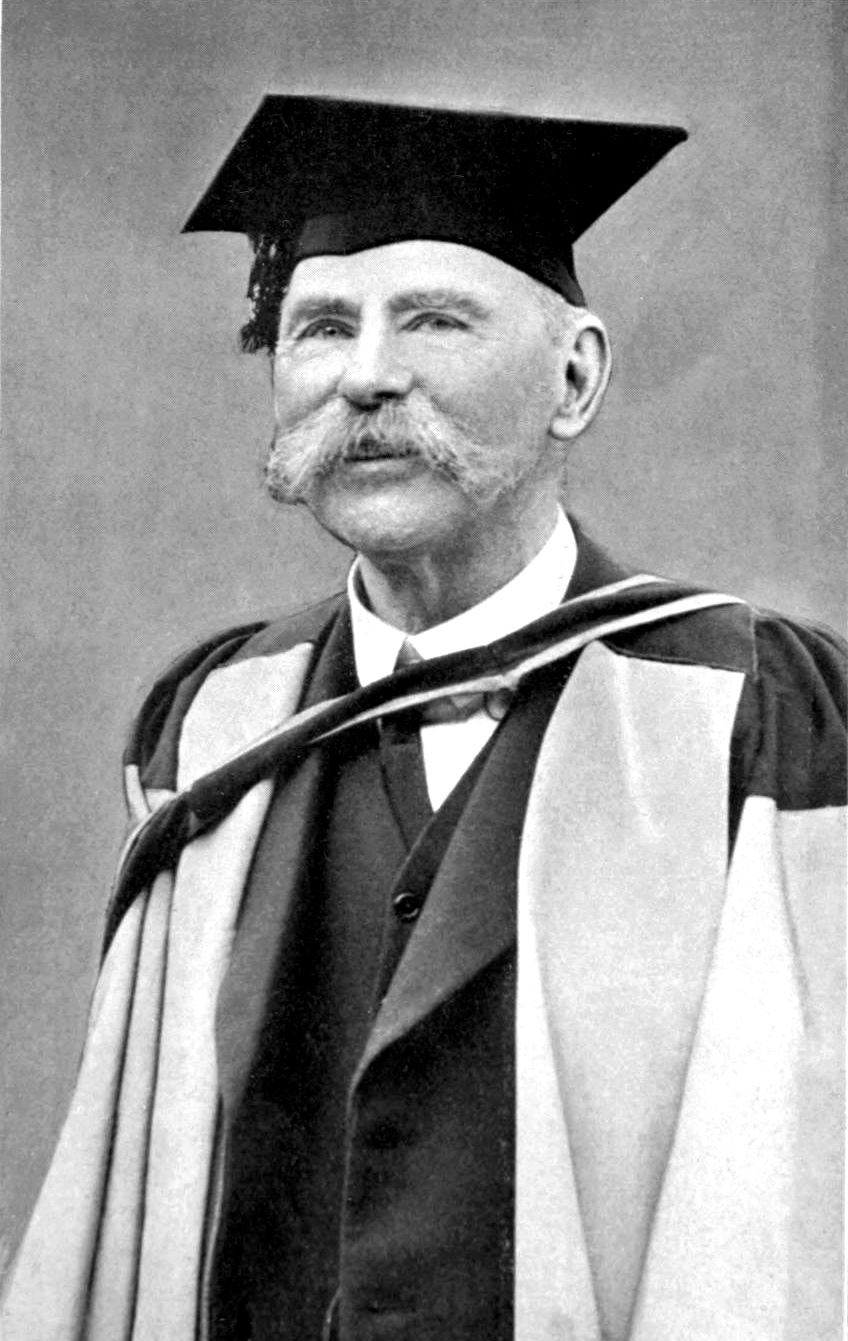
Douglas Hyde

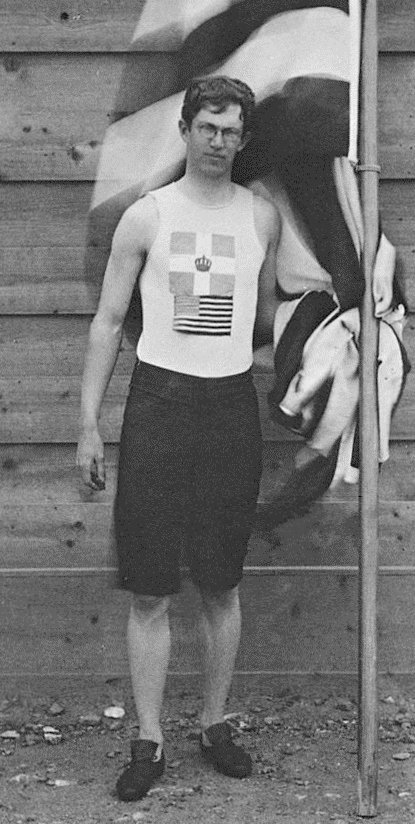
Ellery Harding Clark

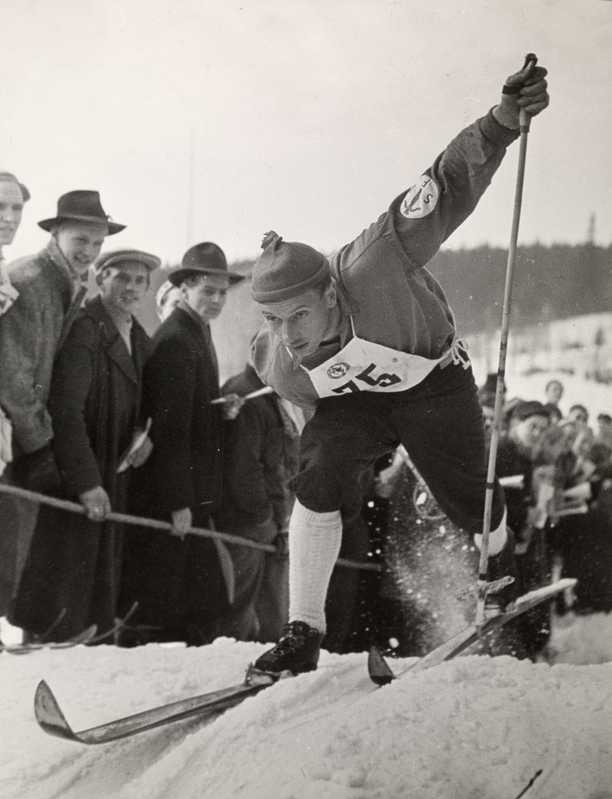
Nils Östensson

- July 2 – Georgi Dimitrov, Bulgarian Communist leader, politician and 32nd prime minister of Bulgaria (b. 1882)
- July 9 – Fritz Hart, British composer (b. 1874)
- July 11 – Corneliu Dragalina, Romanian general (b. 1887)
- July 12 – Douglas Hyde, Irish academic, linguist and scholar, 1st president of Ireland (b. 1860)
- July 15
  - Anastasios Dalipis, Greek army officer, politician (b. 1896)
  - Eva Hubback, British feminist (b. 1886)
- July 18
  - Ted Alley, Australian footballer (b. 1881)
  - Francisco Javier Arana, Guatemalan Army officer (b. 1905)
  - Vítězslav Novák, Czech composer (b. 1870)
- July 19 – Frank Murphy, American politician and Associate Justice of the Supreme Court of the United States (b. 1890)
- July 21 – Cesare Formichi, Italian baritone (b. 1883)
- July 23 – Masaharu Anesaki, Japanese scholar (b. 1873)
- July 24
  - Nils Östensson, Swedish Olympic cross-country skier (b. 1918)
  - Ada Baker, Australian soprano, singing teacher and vaudeville star (b. 1866)
- July 25 – Ubaldo Soddu, Italian general (b. 1883)
- July 26 – Linda Arvidson, American actress (b. 1884)
- July 27 – Ellery Harding Clark, American Olympic athlete (b. 1874)
- July 29 – József Koszta, Hungarian painter (b. 1861)
- July 30
  - Stoyan Danev, 13th prime minister of Bulgaria (b. 1858)
  - Albin Andersson, Swedish farmer, manager and politician (b. 1873)
  - Vicenta Chávez Orozco, Mexican Roman Catholic religious professed and blessed (b. 1867)
- July 31 – Alfred Bashford, English cricketer (b. 1881)

=== August ===
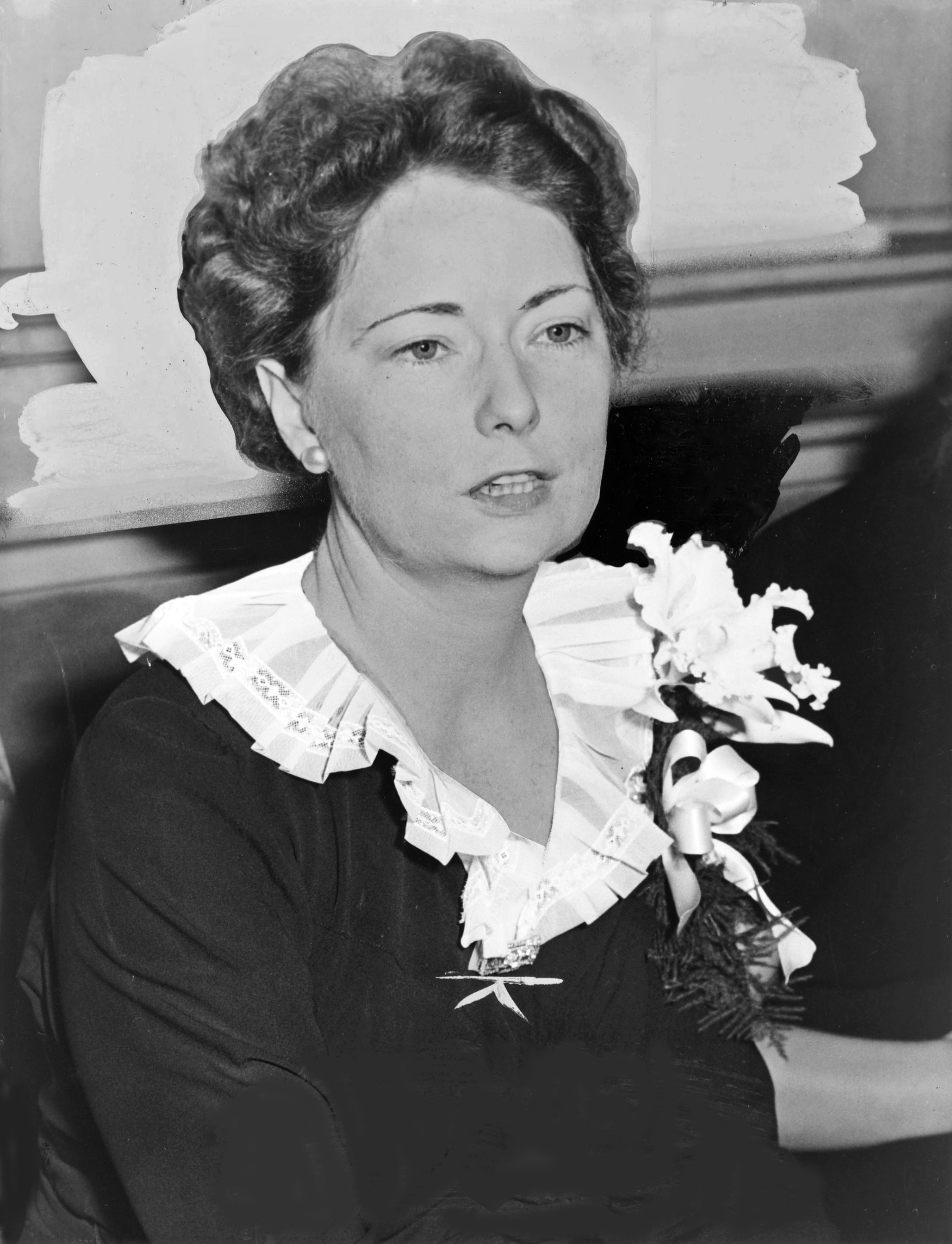
Margaret Mitchell

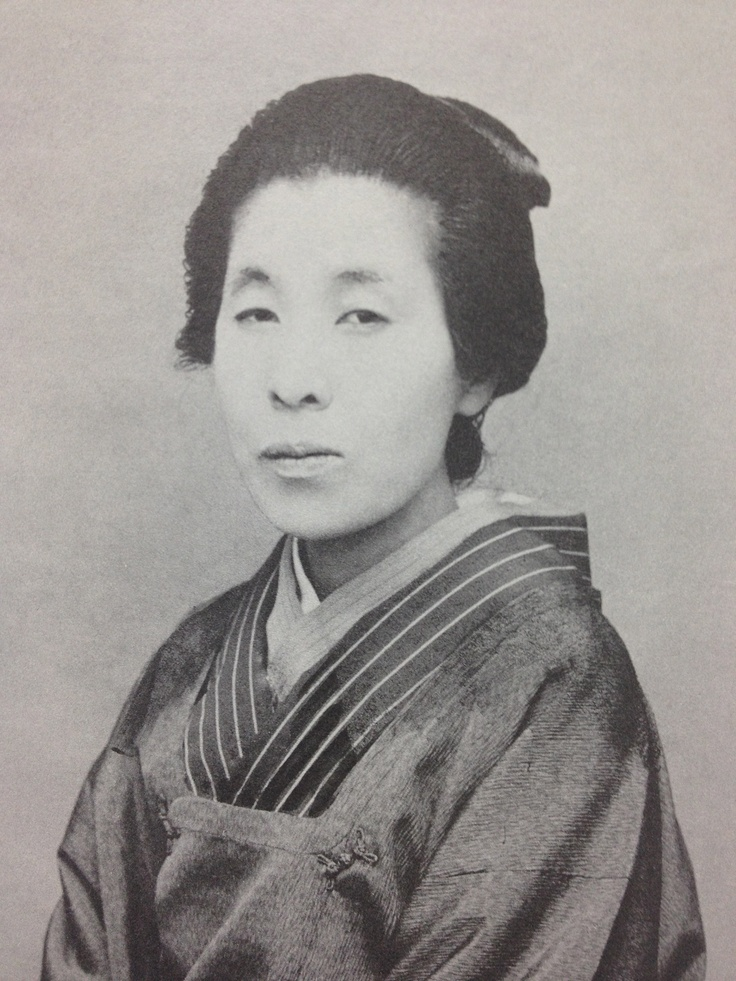
Uemura Shōen

- August 3 – Ignotus, Hungarian editor, writer (b. 1869)
- August 4 – Liberato Pinto, 78th prime minister of Portugal (b. 1880)
- August 5 – Ernest Fourneau, French chemist, pharmacologist (b. 1872)
- August 9
  - Gustavus M. Blech, German-born American physician, surgeon (b. 1870)
  - Harry Davenport, American actor (b. 1866)
  - G. E. M. Skues, British inventor of nymph fly fishing (b. 1858)
  - Edward Thorndike, American psychologist (b. 1874)
- August 10 – Homer Burton Adkins, American chemist (b. 1892)
- August 12 – George Cross, Australian actor, director (b. c.1873)
- August 14
  - Muhsin al-Barazi, Syrian academic, lawyer, politician and 24th prime minister of Syria (b. 1904)
  - Husni al-Za'im, Syrian military man, politician, 23rd prime minister of Syria and 9th president of Syria (b. 1897)
- August 16
  - Ramon Briones Luco, Chilean lawyer, politician (b. 1872)
  - Margaret Mitchell, American writer (Gone With the Wind) (b. 1900)
- August 20 – Ludwig Halberstädter, German-born Israeli radiologist (b. 1876)
- August 22 – Amado Aguirre Santiago, Mexican general, politician (b. 1863)
- August 23
  - Domingo Díaz Arosemena, Panamian politician, 12th president of Panama (b. 1875)
  - Herbert Greenfield, Canadian politician, 4th premier of Alberta (b. 1869)
- August 27
  - Abdulkerim Abbas, Chinese politician (b. 1921)
  - Uemura Shōen, Japanese artist (b. 1875)
- August 29 – Franciszek Latinik, Polish general (b. 1864)
- August 30
  - Arthur Fielder, English cricketer (b. 1877)
  - Hans Kindler, American cellist, conductor (b. 1892)
  - Sevasti Qiriazi, Albanian educator, women's rights activist (b. 1871)

=== September ===
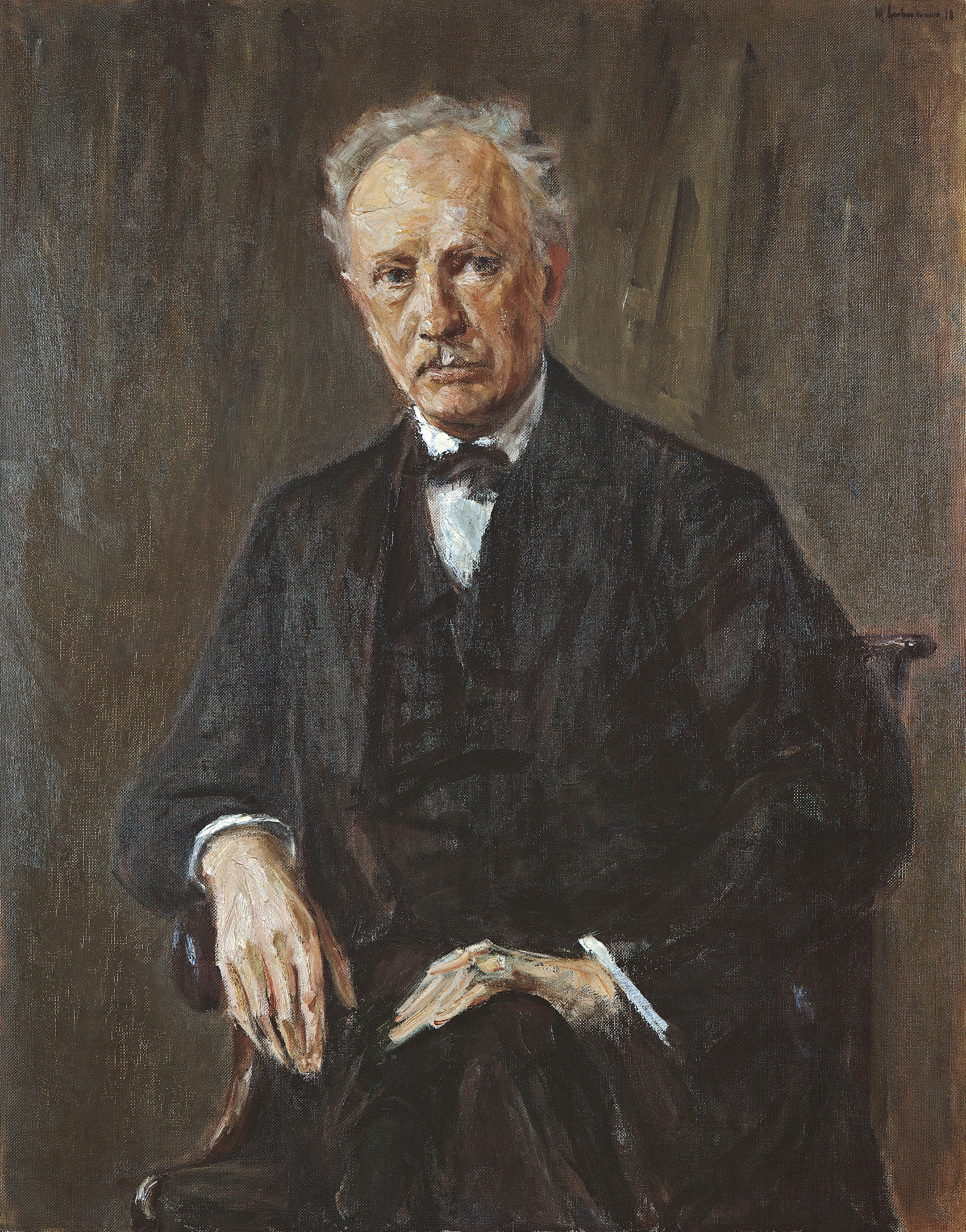
Richard Strauss

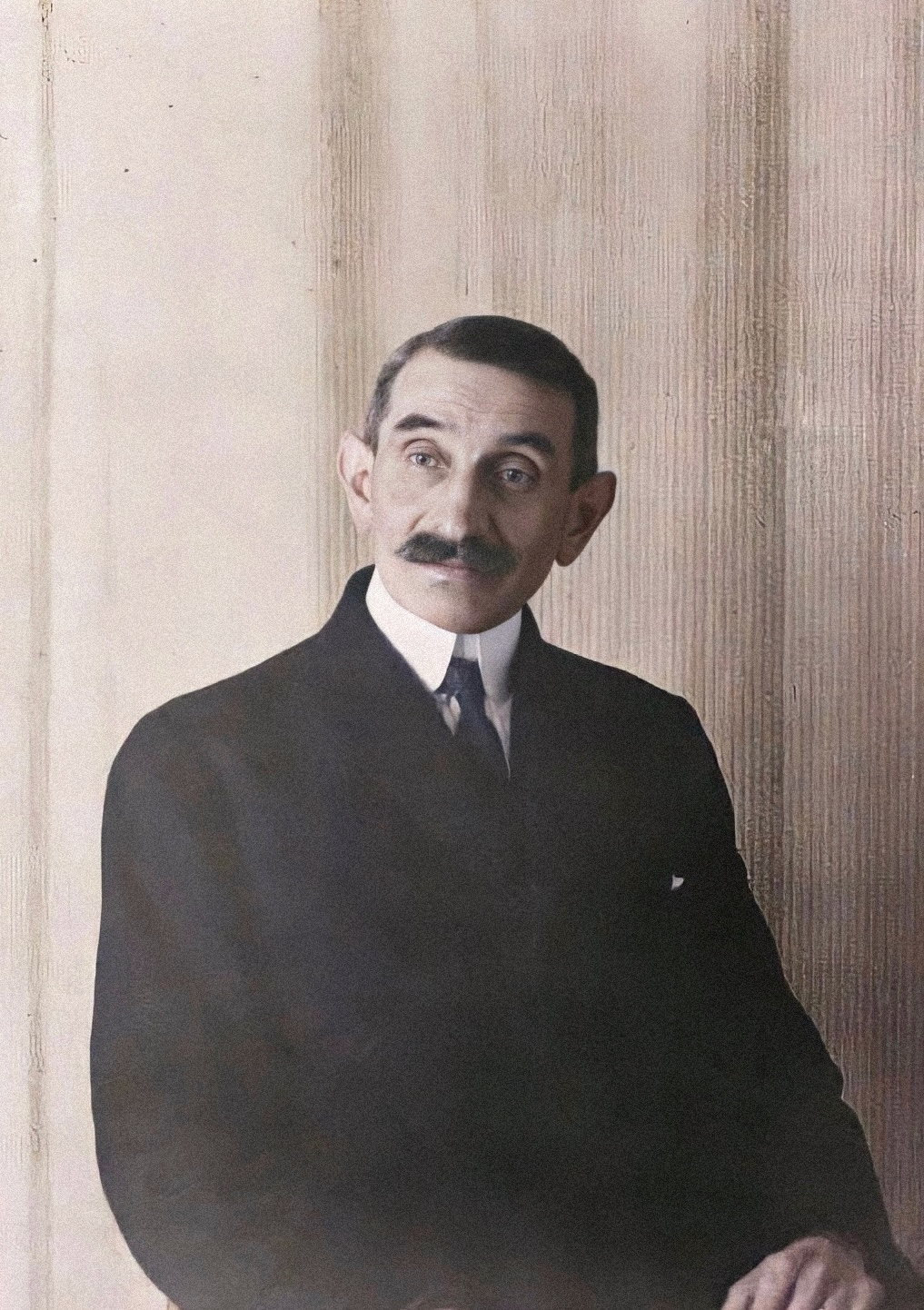
Pandeli Evangjeli

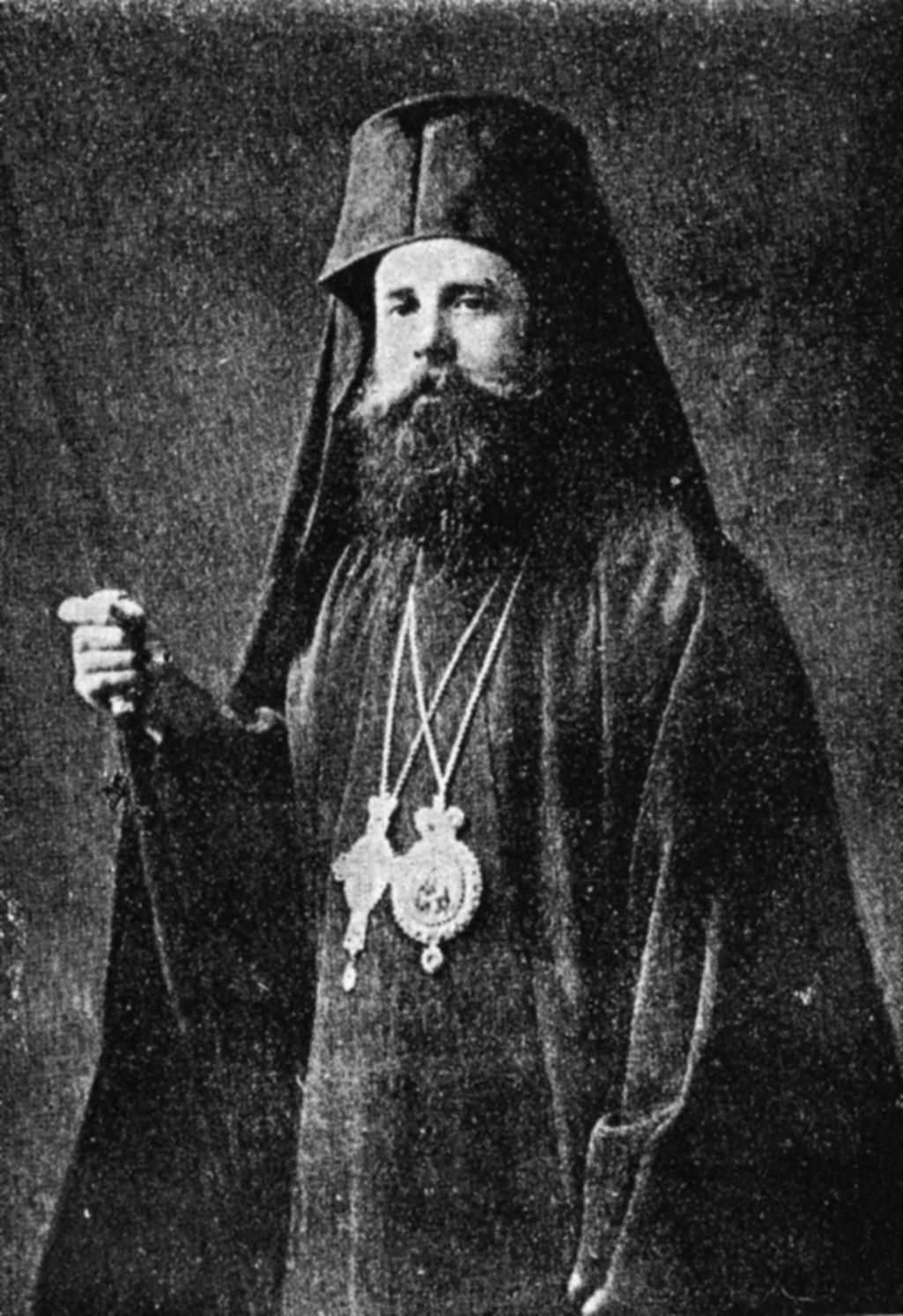
Archbishop Chrysanthus of Athens

- September 6
  - Song Qiyun, communist activist, executed (b. 1904)
  - Song Zhenzhong, child internee, executed (b. 1941)
  - Xu Linxia, communist activist, executed (b. 1904/1905)
  - Yang Hucheng, general, executed (b. 1893)
- September 7 – José Clemente Orozco, Mexican painter (b. 1883)
- September 8 – Richard Strauss, German composer (Also Sprach Zarathustra) (b. 1864)
- September 10 – Wiley Rutledge, U.S. Supreme Court Justice (b. 1894)
- September 12
  - Harry Burleigh, American composer (b. 1866)
  - Erik Adolf von Willebrand, Finnish physician (b. 1870)
- September 13
  - José Ignacio Cárdenas, Venezuelan diplomat, physician (b. 1874)
  - August Krogh, Danish zoophysiologist, recipient of the Nobel Prize in Physiology or Medicine (b. 1874)
- September 14
  - Gottfried Graf von Bismarck-Schönhausen, German Resistance figure (b. 1901)
  - Pandeli Evangjeli, Albanian politician, 7th prime minister of Albania (b. 1859)
- September 15 – Heinie Beckendorf, American baseball catcher (b. 1884)
- September 18 – Frank Morgan, American actor (b. 1890)
- September 19
  - Will Cuppy, American humorist (b. 1884)
  - George Shiels, Irish writer (b. 1886)
  - Nikos Skalkottas, Greek composer (b. 1901)
- September 20 – Richard Dix, American actor (b. 1893)
- September 22 – Sam Wood, American director (b. 1883)
- September 24 – Pierre de Bréville, French composer (b. 1861)
- September 25 – Peter Nielsen, Danish actor (b. 1876)
- September 27 – David Adler, American architect (b. 1882)
- September 28
  - Archbishop Chrysanthus of Athens (b. 1881)
  - Émile Eddé, 4th prime minister, 3rd president of Lebanon (b. 1886)

=== October ===
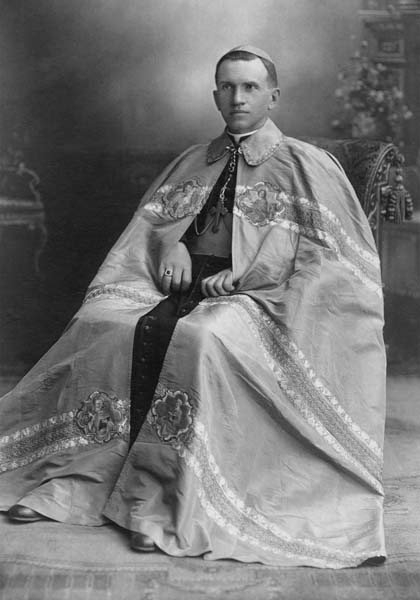
Blessed Nykyta Budka

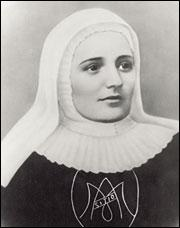
Saint Laura Montoya

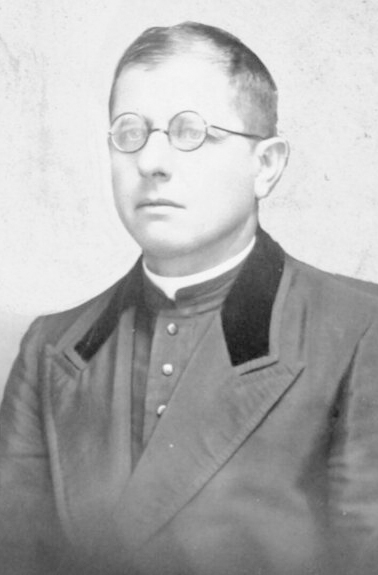
- Blessed Lorenzo Massa
  October 1
  - Nykyta Budka, Soviet Roman Catholic bishop, martyr and blessed (b. 1877)
  - Buddy Clark, American pop singer (b. 1912)
- October 2 – Luis Armiñán Pérez, Spanish politician (b. 1871)
- October 4 – Federico Beltrán Masses, Spanish painter (b. 1885)
- October 6
  - Metropolitan Timotheos of Australia, Greek Orthodox priest, bishop (b. 1880)
  - Robert Wilson Lynd, Irish journalist and writer (b. 1879)
- October 7 – Matiu Ratana, New Zealand politician (b. 1912)
- October 8 – Gheorghe Mironescu, Romanian politician, 33rd prime minister of Romania (b. 1874)
- October 9 – Emanuele Foà, Italian engineer, physicist (b. 1892)
- October 14
  - Fritz Leiber, American actor (b. 1882)
  - Roman Lysko, Soviet Roman Catholic and Orthodox priest, martyr and blessed (b. 1914)
- October 15
  - Elmer Clifton, American actor, director (b. 1890)
  - László Rajk, Hungarian Communist politician, former foreign minister (executed) (b. 1909)
  - Jacques Copeau, French actor, producer, director and dramatist (b. 1879)
- October 17 – Aurel Aldea, Romanian general and politician (b. 1887)
- October 21 – Laura of Saint Catherine of Siena, Colombian Roman Catholic religious professed and saint (b. 1874)
- October 22 – Craig Reynolds, American actor (b. 1907)
- October 23
  - Almanzo Wilder, American writer, husband of Laura Ingalls Wilder (b. 1857)
  - John Robert Clynes, British trade unionist, Labour politician (b. 1869)
- October 27
  - František Halas, Czechoslovak essayist, poet and translator (b. 1901)
  - Ginette Neveu, French violinist (b. 1919)
- October 28
  - Marcel Cerdan, French professional boxer (killed in plane crash) (b. 1916)
  - Patriarch Guregh Israelian of Jerusalem (b. 1894)
- October 29
  - George Gurdjieff, Soviet spiritual teacher (b. 1866)
  - Chikuhei Nakajima, Japanese naval officer, engineer, and politician, founder of the Nakajima Aircraft Company (b. 1884)
- October 31
  - Jindřich Bišický, Czechoslovak author (b. 1889)
  - Lorenzo Massa, Argentine Roman Catholic priest and blessed (b. 1882)
  - Edward Stettinius, Jr., U.S. secretary of state (b. 1900)

=== November ===
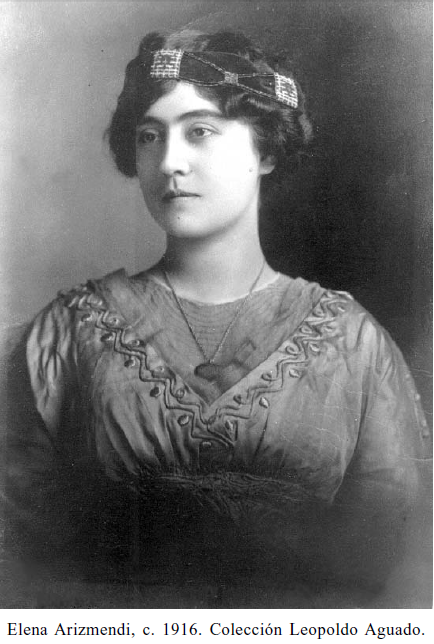
Elena Arizmendi Mejía

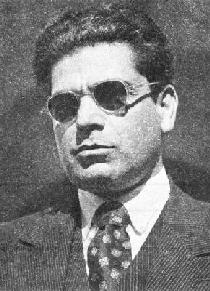
Abdolhossein Hazhir

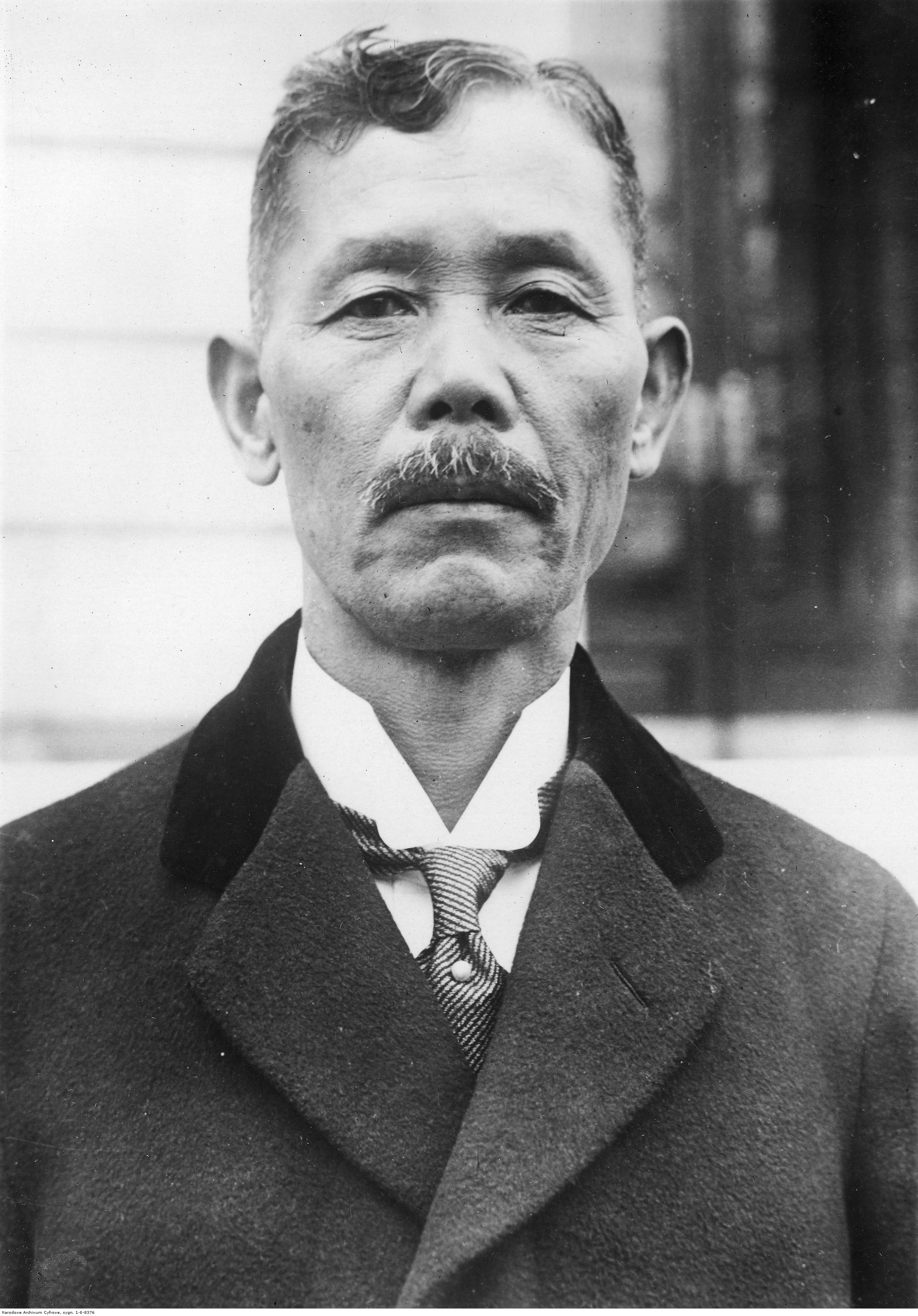
Wakatsuki Reijirō

- November – María Josepha Sophia de Iturbide, head of the Imperial House of Mexico (b. 1872)
- November 2 – Susan Carlson, American politician
- November 3
  - William Desmond, Irish actor (b. 1878)
  - Solomon R. Guggenheim, American philanthropist (b. 1861)
- November 4
  - Elena Arizmendi Mejía, Mexican feminist and founder of the Neutral White Cross (b. 1884)
  - Walther von Bonstetten, Swiss Boy Scout Association founder (b. 1867)
- November 5 – Abdolhossein Hazhir, 54th prime minister of Iran (b. 1899)
- November 8 – August Hagenbach, Swiss physicist (b. 1871)
- November 11
  - Mun Bhuridatta, Thai Buddhist monk (b. 1870)
  - Prince Carlos of Bourbon-Two Sicilies (b. 1870)
  - Ignatius Stelletskii, Soviet archaeologist, historian and researcher (b. 1878)
- November 12 – Walter Buch, German SS general (b. 1883)
- November 15 – Nathuram Godse, assassin of Mohandas Gandhi (b. 1910), and his accomplice, Narayan Apte (b. 1911)
- November 19 – James Ensor, Belgian painter (b. 1860)
- November 20 – Wakatsuki Reijirō, 25th and 28th prime minister of Japan (b. 1866)
- November 23 – Prince Ludwig Ferdinand of Bavaria (b. 1859)
- November 25
  - Mizuno Rentarō, Japanese statesman, politician and cabinet minister (b. 1868)
  - Bill Robinson, African-American dancer (b. 1878)
- November 27
  - Charles F. Haanel, American New Thought author and businessman (b. 1866)
  - Vincenzo Irolli, Italian painter (b. 1860)
  - Martin Benno Schmidt, German pathologist (b. 1863)
- November 30 – Dame Irene Vanbrugh, British actress (b. 1872)

=== December ===
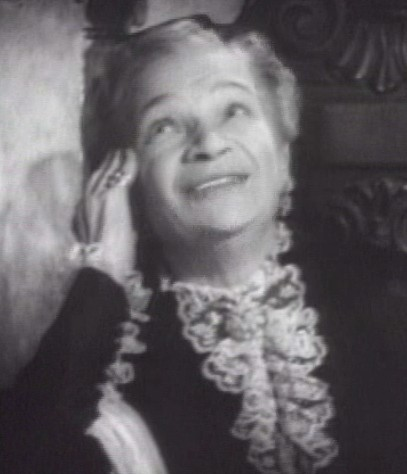
Maria Ouspenskaya

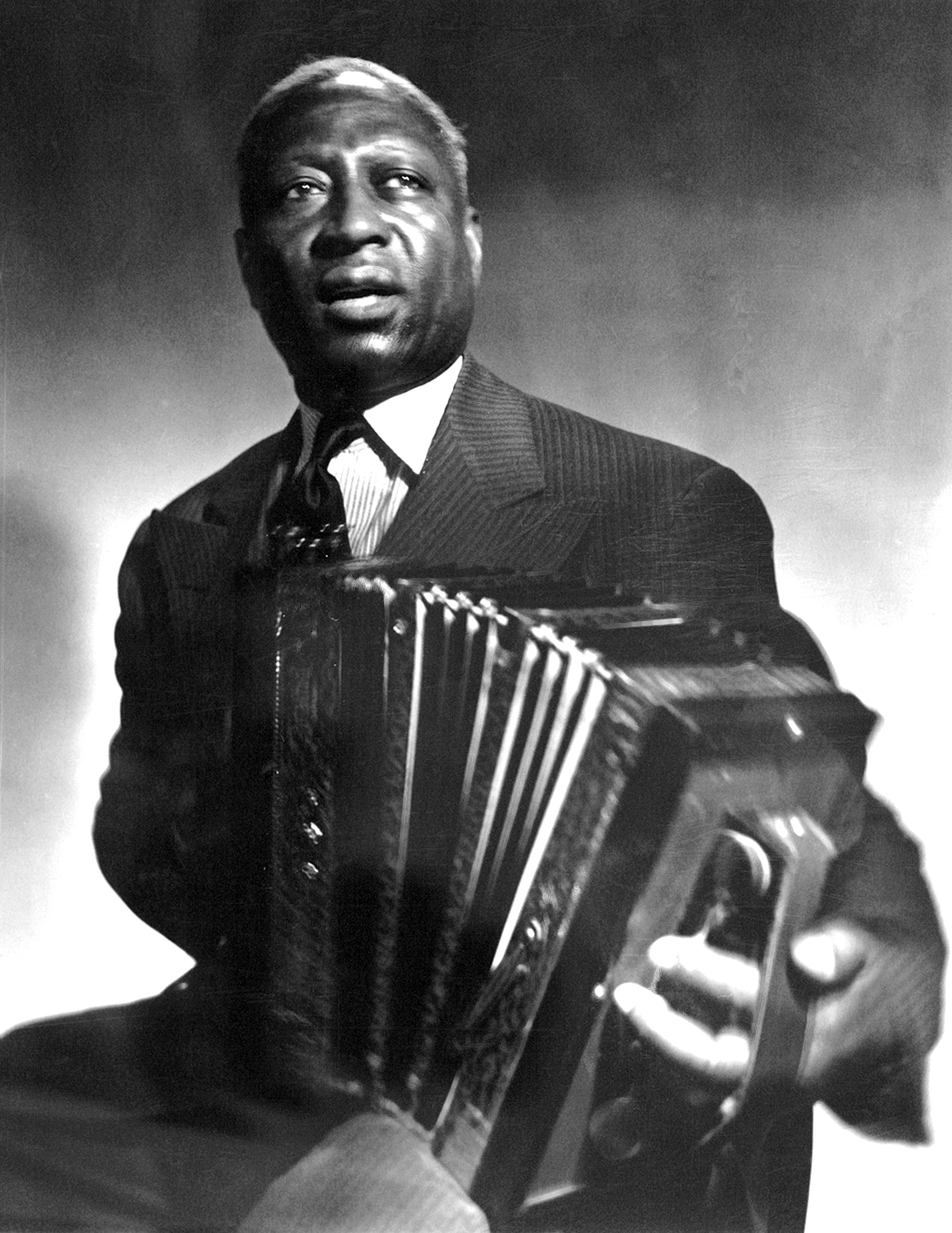
Lead Belly

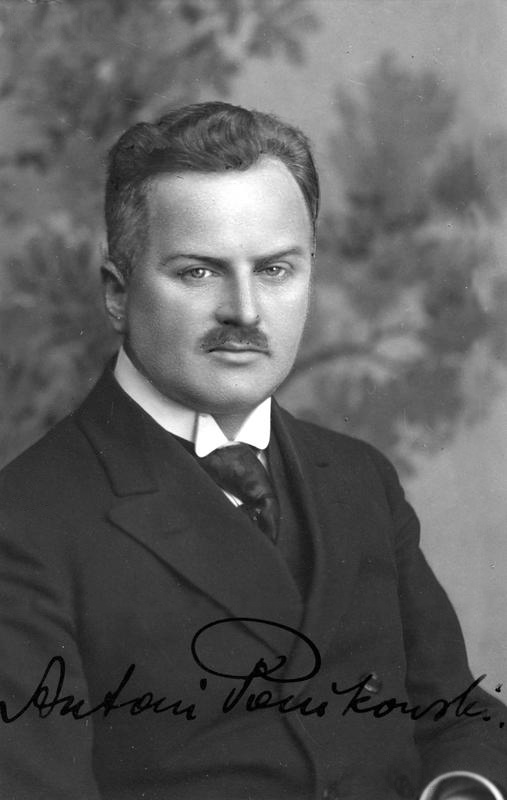
Antoni Ponikowski

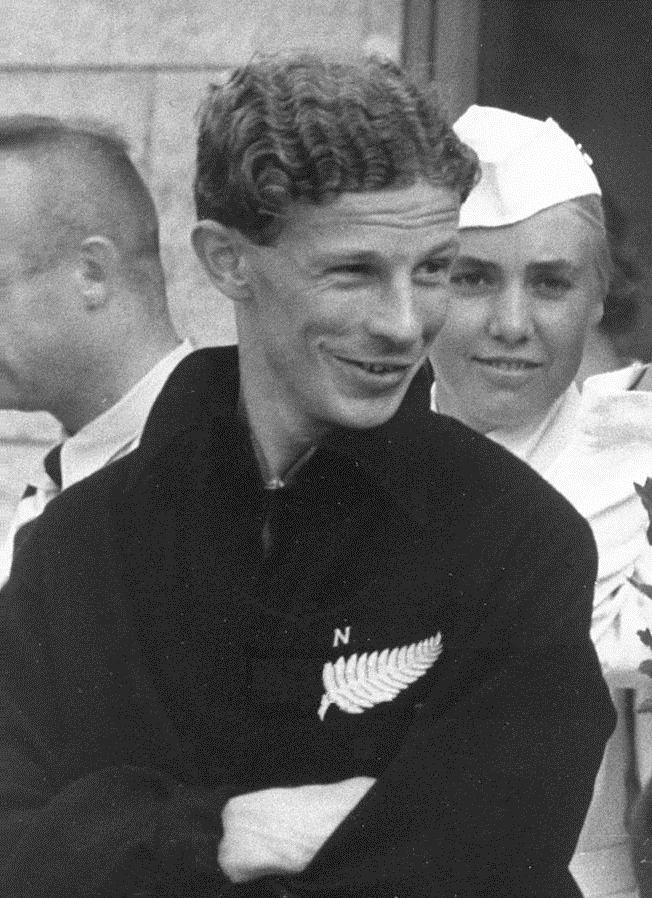
Jack Lovelock

- December 3
  - Philip Barry, American playwright (b. 1896)
  - Maria Ouspenskaya, Soviet actress, acting teacher (b. 1876)
- December 5 – Arthur Bedford, British navy officer (b. 1881)
- December 6
  - Lead Belly, African-American blues musician (b. 1888)
  - José María Zeledón Brenes, Costa Rican politician, poet, writer and journalist (b. 1877)
- December 7 – Rex Beach, American novelist, playwright and Olympic water polo player (b. 1877)
- December 8 – George Barnes, Australian businessman, politician (b. 1856)
- December 11
  - Krishna Chandra Bhattacharya, Indian philosopher (b. 1875)
  - Marian Grzybowski, Polish dermatologist (b. 1895)
- December 16
  - Sidney Olcott, Canadian film director (b. 1873)
  - Lee White, American actor (b. 1888)
- December 22 – Manuel Camus, Filipino lawyer, politician (b. 1875)
- December 23
  - Arthur Eichengrün, German chemist (b. 1867)
  - Felix Kaufmann, Austrian-born American philosopher (b. 1895)
- December 24 – Gertrude Bacon, British polymath and aeronautical pioneer (b. 1874)
- December 25 – Leon Schlesinger, American producer, filmmaker (b. 1884)
- December 26 – Julius Brandt, Austrian actor (b. 1873)
- December 27 – Antoni Ponikowski, Polish academician, politician and 7th prime minister of Poland (b. 1878)
- December 28
  - Hervey Allen, American author (b. 1889)
  - Jack Lovelock, New Zealand Olympic athlete (b. 1910)
- December 30 – Leopold IV, Prince of Lippe (b. 1871)
- December 31
  - Josef Maria Auchentaller, Austrian architect, painter, draftsman and printmaker (b. 1865)
  - Raimond Valgre, Estonian composer, musician (b. 1913)

=== Date unknown ===
- Constantin Atanasescu, Romanian general (b. 1885)
- Abd Allah Siraj, Prime Minister of Jordan (b. 1876)
- Ernest Spybuck, Native American artist (b. 1883)
- Zhang Haipeng, Chinese and Manchukuoan general (executed) (b. 1867)

== Nobel Prizes ==

- Physics – Hideki Yukawa
- Chemistry – William Francis Giauque
- Medicine – Walter Rudolf Hess and António Caetano de Abreu Freire Egas Moniz
- Literature – William Faulkner
- Peace – John Boyd Orr
