= Chigger (disambiguation) =

Chiggers are tiny harvest mites, members of the family Trombiculidae, that can cause intense itching and dermatitis.

Chigger may also refer to:

- Chigger (word), a Tasmanian synonym for the Australian word "bogan" (an unrefined or unsophisticated person)
- Chigger bite or Trombiculosis, the rash caused by chiggers
- Chigger Browne (1888–1955), American football player and track coach
- Chigger flower, a species of milkweed native to eastern North America
- Nesmith Chigger, a model of airplane
- A satirical word on Chinese nationalism

== See also ==
- Chigger Hill, Alabama, an unincorporated community in DeKalb County, Alabama, United States
- Chig (disambiguation)
- Chigoe flea or jigger (Tunga penetrans), often confused with chiggers
- Jigger (disambiguation)
