= Rickettsial disease =

Rickettsial diseases are a group of infectious diseases caused by various species of bacteria belonging to the order Rickettsia, including from various genera (such as Anaplasma, Rickettsia, Ehrlichia, and others). These bacteria are typically transmitted to humans through the bites of infected arthropods, such as ticks, fleas, and lice. Rickettsial diseases are characterized by a range of symptoms, which can vary depending on the specific type of rickettsial infection but often include fever, headache, rash, and muscle aches.

Some well-known rickettsial diseases include:

- Rickettsialpox - caused by Rickettsia akari, this disease is transmitted by mite bites and is generally milder than other rickettsial infections.
- Rocky Mountain spotted fever - caused by Rickettsia rickettsii, this disease is transmitted by tick bites and is prevalent in the Americas.
- Scrub typhus - caused by Orientia tsutsugamushi (formerly classified as a Rickettsia), this disease is transmitted by chigger bites and is common in parts of Asia and the Pacific.
- Typhus - there are different types of typhus, including epidemic typhus caused by Rickettsia prowazekii (transmitted by lice) and murine typhus caused by Rickettsia typhi (transmitted by fleas).
