= Neotrombicula fujigmo =

Scientific classification
- Kingdom: Animalia
- Phylum: Arthropoda
- Subphylum: Chelicerata
- Class: Arachnida
- Order: Trombidiformes
- Family: Trombiculidae
- Genus: Neotrombicula
- Subgenus: Neotrombicula
- Species: N. fujigmo

Binomial name
- Neotrombicula fujigmo (Philip & Fuller, 1950)

Synonyms
- Trombicula fujigmo Philip & Fuller, 1950; Tragardhula fujigmo (Philip & Fuller, 1950)

Species of mite

Neotrombicula fujigmo is a species of harvest mite. It is an ectoparasite of shrews and rats. N. fujigmo is found in the Indomalayan realm and has been recorded in Myanmar and India. Cornelius Becker Philip and H. S. Fuller described the species in 1950, initially placing it in the genus Trombicula. The specific epithet comes from the military slang FUJIGMO.

== Etymology ==
The etymology Cornelius B. Philip and H. S. Fuller gave with their description says that it "commemorates a humorous, slang term evolved by soldiers of the Allied Forces in the Far East to express their impatience to return home after V-J Day." FUJIGMO is military slang and an acronym for Fuck you, Jack, I got my orders. Philip first saw this phrase, using the less common spelling FUGIGMO, in Japan at the end of World War II; he saw it printed over the door of an American officer's tent. The officer explained it was a slogan used to express soldiers' impatience to return home. Philip proposed this would be a good name for a species to Fuller, who agreed. The term FUJIGMO has also been described as "an expression of indifference and mild defiance"; after getting separation, members of the armed forces might become apathetic about what would happen to the rest of their unit. FUJIGMO could also accompany a refusal to obey someone who had been their superior after getting transfer orders but before physically relocating.

Philip was known for coming up with humorous, whimsical names for taxa such as Chrysops balzaphire ("balls of fire") and Tabanus rhizonshine ("rise and shine"). The expletive nature of the etymology has led this species to be included in lists and discussions of taxa with unusual or humorous names. The entomologist Arnold Menke listed Trombicula fujigmo in a 1993 list of "Funny or Curious Zoological Names" with the instructions to "ask any WWII vet what 'fujigmo' stands for".

== Distribution ==
N. fujigmo is found in the Indomalayan realm. As of 2021 it has only been recorded in India and Myanmar. The type locality is 12 miles (19 km) north of Myitkyina, Kachin State, Myanmar. It has also been found in Northeast India, including Kanglatongbi, in Manipur. Elsewhere in India, it has been recorded in Thiruvananthapuram district, Kerala.

== Description ==
Only the larva of the species has been described. Eyes are in a 2/2 arrangement on the ocular plat of the idiosoma. There are 40 dorsal setae on the idiosoma, arranged 8-8-8(10)-10(8)-6. The gnathosoma has a palpal setal formula of B/B.NNB/7B.S and the palpal claw has three prongs. The scutum is subpentagonal and caudally rounded. The type host is the voracious shrew, Crocidura vorax. Paratypes were also collected from the Asian house rat, Rattus tanezumi. (Note: Reported under the trinomen "Rattus rattus sladeni (Anderson)".) It has been found on the lesser bandicoot rat.

== Taxonomic history ==
Philip and Fuller first described this species in 1950, placing it in the genus Trombicula. Their description was based on eighteen larval specimens (one holotype and seventeen paratypes) which the U.S. Typhus Commission collected in northern Myanmar in 1944–1945. The holotype larva was deposited in the U.S. National Museum. Paratypes were deposited in the U.S. National Museum, the British Museum (Natural History), the Rocky Mountain Laboratory, and the South Australian Museum, as well as the personal collections of G. W. Wharton, Takeo Tamiya, C. B. Philip, and H. S. Fuller. A 2021 listing of Trombiculid type specimens in U.S. National Entomology Collection, Smithsonian Institution, included four larval paratypes but did not include the holotype.

Philip and Fuller placed it in the autumnalis species group within Trombicula. They noted that T. autumnalis was the type species of Neotrombicula, a subgenus Arthur Stanley Hirst had named in 1925, however Philip and Fuller did not include any subgenera in their taxonomy of Trombicula. Instead, they placed it "provisionally in the genus Trombicula sensu lato". Trombicula fujigmo was also the combination Carl E.M. Gunther used in 1952. In 1952, George W. Wharton and Fuller included Neotrombicula as a subgenus of Trombicula, giving the species the name T. (N.) fujigmo. Audy also listed T. fujigmo as being within the subgenus Neotrombicula sensu stricto in 1953.

In 1952, Herbert Womersley included it in the genus Tragardhula; this was followed by a few other taxonomic works in the 1950s, including Charles D. Radford in 1954 (Note: Written as "T. fujigma".) and J. Ralph Audy and colleagues in 1953. In 1957, Neotrombicula was itself given genus status, giving it its present binomial: N. fujigmo. Arachnologists differ as to if the genus Neotrombicula itself has subgenera or not. Taxonomists who do divide Neotrombicula into multiple subgenera place N. fujigmo into the nominotypical subgenus: N. (Neotrombicula) fujigmo, N. fujigmo has sometimes been placed in the bisignata group within Neotrombicula, but others have disagreed with this group placement.
