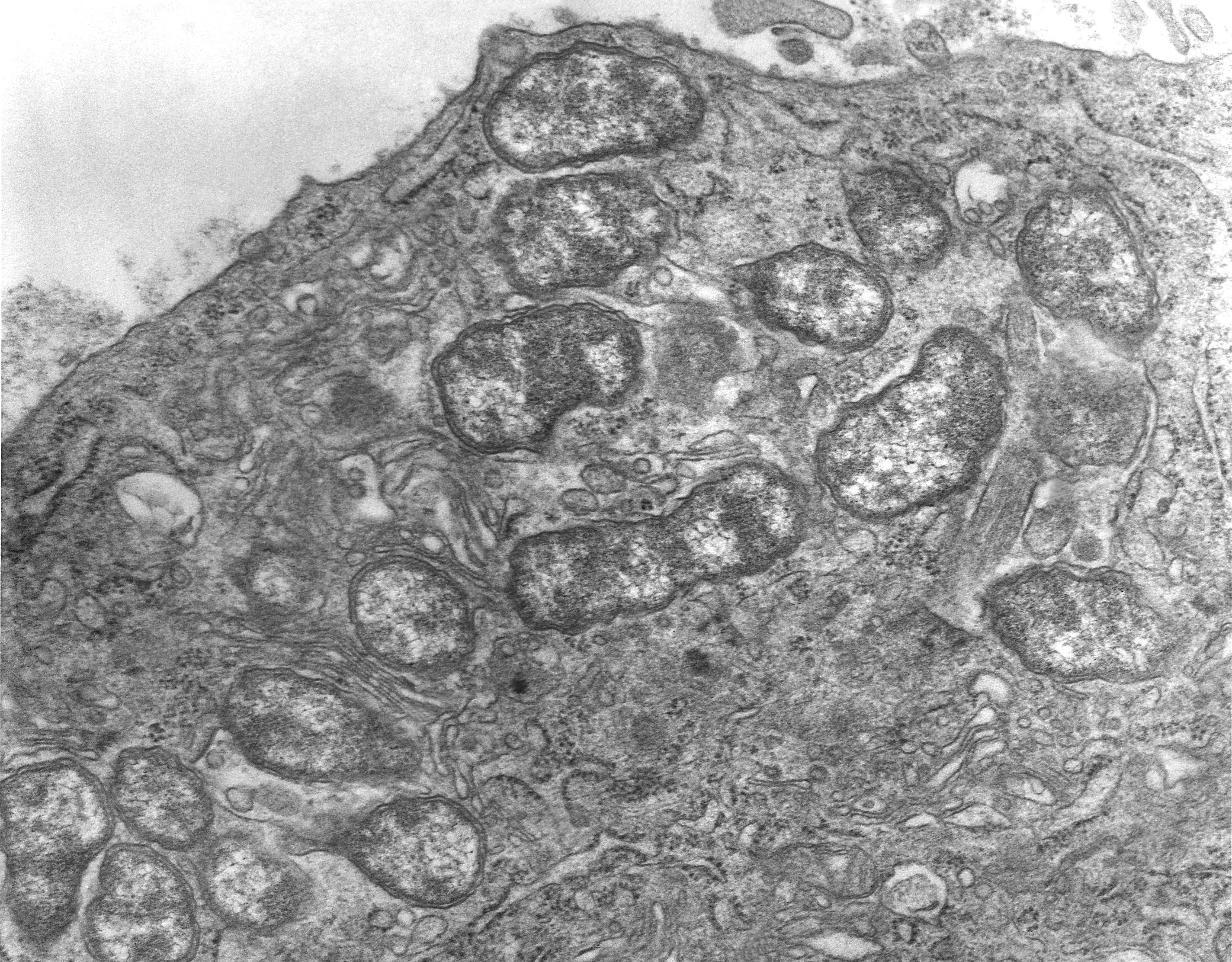
- Transmission electron micrograph

Scientific classification
- Domain: Bacteria
- Kingdom: Pseudomonadati
- Phylum: Pseudomonadota
- Class: Alphaproteobacteria
- Order: Rickettsiales
- Family: Rickettsiaceae
- Genus: Orientia
- Species: O. tsutsugamushi

Binomial name
- Orientia tsutsugamushi (Hayashi, 1920) (Ogata, 1929) Tamura et al., 1995

= Orientia tsutsugamushi =

Species of bacterium

Orientia tsutsugamushi (from Japanese tsutsuga meaning "illness", and mushi meaning "insect") is a mite-borne bacterium belonging to the family Rickettsiaceae and is responsible for a disease called scrub typhus in humans. It is a natural and an obligate intracellular parasite of mites belonging to the family Trombiculidae. With a genome of only 2.0–2.7 Mb, it has the most repeated DNA sequences among bacterial genomes sequenced so far. The disease, scrub typhus, occurs when infected mite larvae bite humans. This infection can prove fatal if prompt doxycycline therapy is not started.

Orientia tsutsugamushi infection was first reported in Japan by Hakuju Hashimoto in 1810, and to the Western world by Theobald Adrian Palm in 1878. Naosuke Hayashi first described it in 1920, giving the name Theileria tsutsugamushi. Owing to its unique properties, it was renamed Orientia tsutsugamushi in 1995. Unlike other Gram-negative bacteria, it is not easily stained with Gram stain, as its cell wall is devoid of lipophosphoglycan and peptidoglycan. With highly variable membrane protein, a 56-kDa protein, the bacterium can be antigenically classified into many strains (sub-types). The classic strains are Karp (which accounts for about 50% of all infections), Gilliam (25%), Kato (less than 10%), Shimokoshi, Kuroki and Kawasaki. Within each strain, enormous variability further exists.

Orientia tsutsugamushi is naturally maintained in the mite population by transmission from female to its eggs (transovarial transmission), and from the eggs to larvae and then to adults (transstadial transmission). The mite larvae, called chiggers, are natural ectoparasites of rodents. Humans get infected upon accidental contact with infected chiggers. A scar-like scab called eschar is a good indicator of infection, but is not ubiquitous. The bacterium is endemic to the so-called Tsutsugamushi Triangle, a region covering the Russian Far East in the north, Japan in the east, northern Australia in the south, and Afghanistan in the west. One million infections are estimated to occur annually. Antibiotics such as azithromycin and doxycycline are the main prescription drugs; chloramphenicol and tetracyclin are also effective. Diagnosis of the infection requires techniques such as Weil–Felix test, rapid immunochromatographic test, immunofluorescence assays, and polymerase chain reaction. There is no vaccine for the infection.

== History ==
The earliest record of O. tsutsugamushi infection was in the 3rd century (313 C.E.) in China. Japanese were also familiar with the link between the infection and mites for centuries. They gave several names such as shima-mushi, akamushi (red mite) or kedani (hairy mite) disease of northern Japan, and most popularly as tsutsugamushi (from tsutsuga meaning fever or harm or illness, and mushi meaning bug or insect). Japanese physician Hakuju Hashimoto gave the first medical account from Niigata Prefecture in 1810. He recorded the prevalence of infection along the banks of the upper tributaries of Shinano River. The first report to the Western world was made by Theobald Adrian Palm, a physician of the Edinburgh Medical Missionary Society at Niigata in 1878. Describing his first-hand experience, Palm wrote:

Last summer [i.e. 1877], I had the opportunity of observing a disease which, so far as I know, is peculiar to Japan, and has not yet been, described. It occurs, moreover, in certain well-marked districts, and at a particular season of the year, so that the opportunities of investigating it do not often occur. It is known here as the shima-mushi, or island-insect disease, and is so-named from the belief that it is caused by the bite or sting of some insect peculiar to certain islands in the river known as Shinagawa, which empties itself into the sea at Niigata.

The aetiology of the disease was unknown until the early 20th century. In 1908, a mite theory of the transmission of tsutsugamushi disease was postulated by Taichi Kitashima and Mikinosuke Miyajima. In 1915, a British zoologist, Stanley Hirst, suggested that the larvae of mite Microtrombidium akamushi (later renamed Leptotrombidium akamushi) which he found on the ears of field mice could carry and transmit the infection. In 1917, Mataro Nagayo and colleagues gave the first complete description of the developmental stages such as egg, nymph, larva, and adult of the mite. They also asserted that only the larvae bites mammals, and are thus the only carriers of the parasites. But then, the actual infectious agent was not known, and it was generally attributed to either a virus or a protozoan.

The causative pathogen was first identified by Naosuke Hayashi in 1920. Confident that the organism was a protozoan, Hayashi concluded, stating, "I have reached the conclusion that the virus of the disease is the species of Piroplasma [protozoan] in question... I consider the organism in Tsutsugamushi disease as a hitherto undescribed species, and at the suggestion of Dr. Henry B. Ward designate it as Theileria tsutsugamushi." Discovering the similarities with the bacterium R. prowazekii, Mataro Nagayo and colleagues gave a new classification with the name Rickettsia orientalis in 1930. (R. prowazekii is a causative bacterium of epidemic typhus first discovered by American physicians Howard Taylor Ricketts and Russell M. Wilder in 1910, and described by a Brazilian physician Henrique da Rocha Lima in 1916.)

The taxonomic confusion worsened. In 1931, Norio Ogata gave the name Rickettsia tsutsugamushi, while Rinya Kawamüra and Yoso Imagawa independently introduced the name Rickettsia akamushi. Kawamüra and Imagawa discovered that the bacteria are stored in the salivary glands of mites, and that mites feed on body (lymph) fluid, thereby establishing the fact that mites transmit the parasites during feeding.

For more than 60 years there was no consensus on the choice of name – both R. orientalis and R. tsutsugamushi were equally used. Akira Tamura and colleagues reported in 1991 the structural differences of the bacterium from Rickettsia species that warranted a separate genus, and proposed the name Orientia tsutsugamushi. Finally, in 1995, they made a new classification based on the morphological and biochemical properties, formally creating the new name O. tsutsugamushi.

== Biology ==
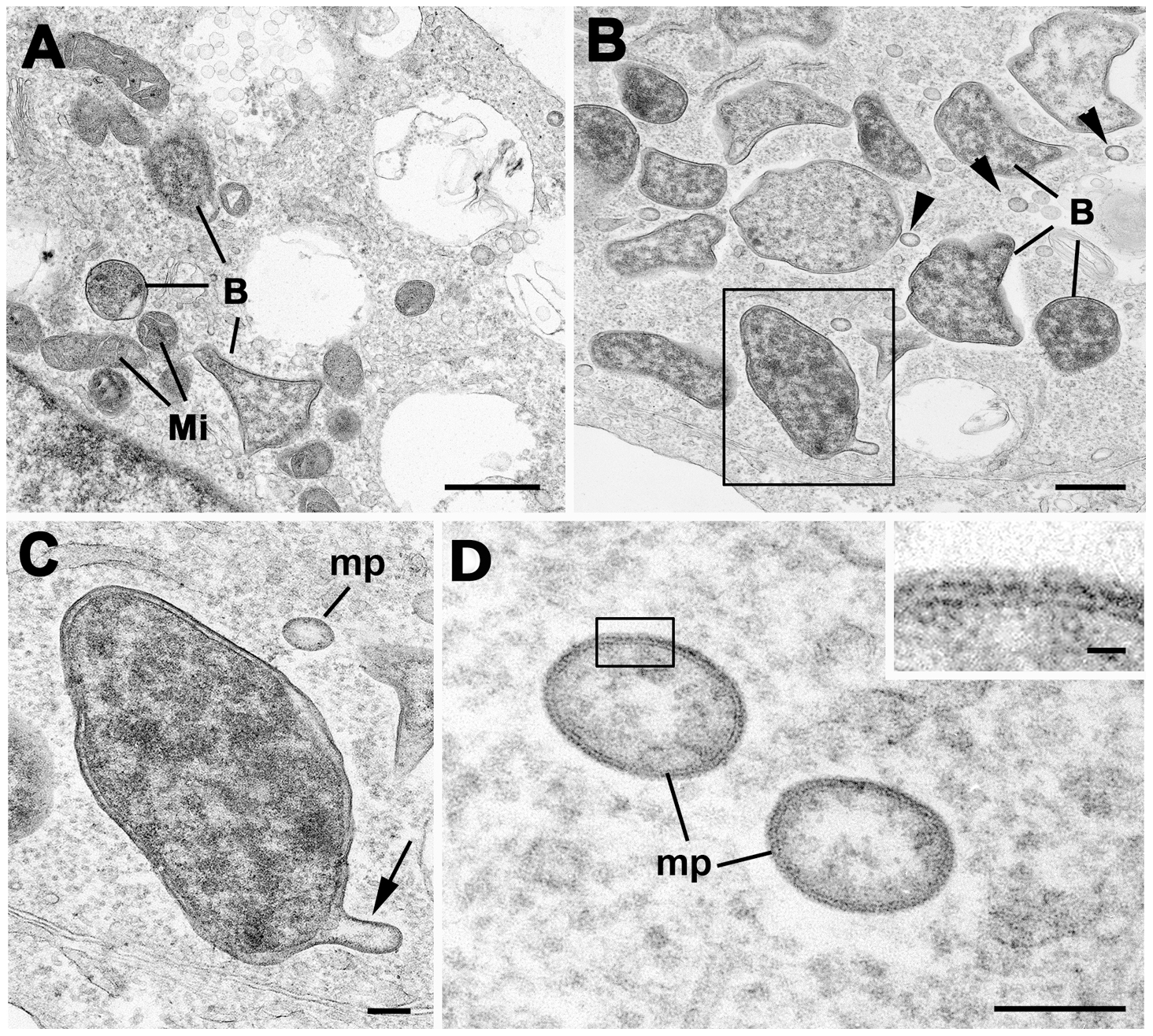
O. tsutsugamushi in human (U937) cells.

Orientia tsutsugamushi is a Gram-negative bacterium and is a permanent (obligate) parasite in mites. Within a single host cell, O. tsutsugamushi rapidly divides into many individuals. A unicellular organism, it is oval shaped and measures 0.5 to 0.8 μm wide and 1.2 to 3.0 μm long. Due to similarity, it was previously classified in the genus Rickettsia among other bacteria, but later assigned a separate genus, Orientia, which it shares (as of 2010) only with Candidatus Orientia chuto. It is broader but shorter than other rickettsial bacteria, which are rod shaped and on average measure 0.25 to 0.3 μm wide and 0.8 to 1 μm long. During reproduction, it divides (by binary fission) into two daughter cells by the process of budding. While undergoing budding, it accumulates on the host cell surface, unlike other bacteria. One complete budding cycle takes 9 to 18 hours.

The bacterium is enclosed by a cell wall on the outside and cell membrane on the inside. The cell covering takes up stains such as Giemsa and Gimenez stains. Although its cell wall has a classic bacterial double layer, its outer leaflet is much thicker than the inner one, which is just the opposite in Rickettsia species. A capsule layer that forms a spherical halo in other bacteria is missing. The cell wall is less rigid due to the absence of peptidoglycan, which is otherwise characteristic of the rigid cell walls of other bacteria. Classic bacterial lipophosphoglycans such as muramic acid, glucosamine, hydroxy fatty acids, heptose, and 2-keto-3-deoxyoctonic acid are also absent in the cell wall. Due to the absence of peptidoglycan, the bacterium is naturally resistant to all β-lactam antibiotics (such as penicillin), to which Rickettsia species are normally sensitive to. Its genome totally lacks the genes for lipophosphoglycan synthesis, but does contain some for those of peptidoglycan. Important genes essential for peptidoglycan synthesis such as alr, dapF and PBP1 are missing: alr encodes an enzyme L-alanine racemase, which converts L-alanine to D-alanine in the first step of peptidoglycan synthesis pathway; dapF encodes diaminopimelate epimerase, which convert LL-2,6-diaminoheptanedioate (L,L-DAP) to meso-diaminoheptanedioate (meso-DAP); and PBP1 encodes penicillin-binding protein-1 (PBP1), which converts periplasmic lipid II to peptidoglycan. Thus, the bacterium cannot synthesise a typical peptidoglycan cell wall, and instead makes a peptidoglycan-like structure on its surface. The cell membrane is also chemically different in its protein composition, and this difference gives rise to strain variations within the species itself.

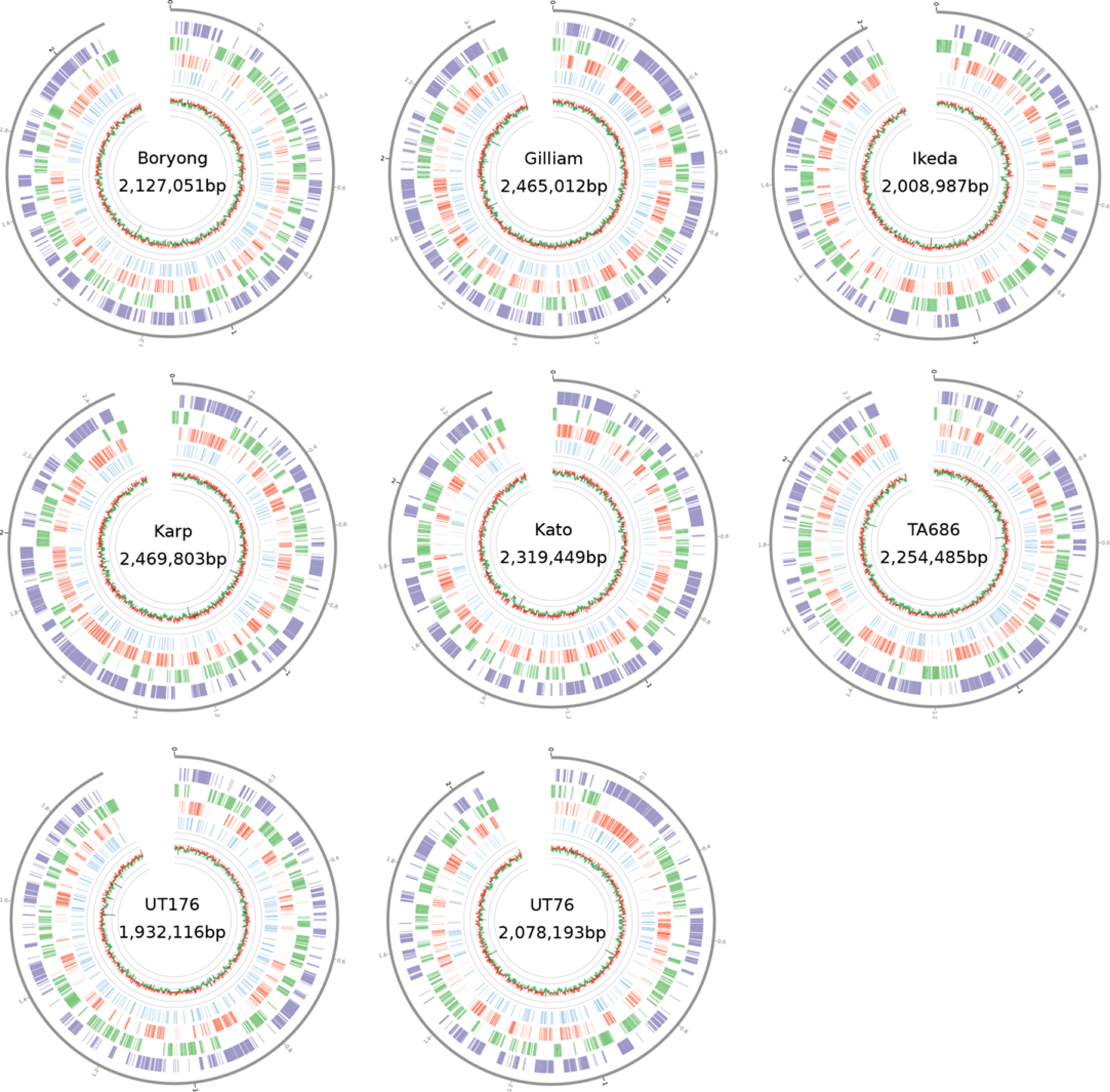
Genomes of O. tsutsugamushi strains. From outermost to innermost ring of each genome: repetitive regions in purple, core genes in green, repeat genes in red and pseudogenes in blue. The innermost line graph shows GC-content (1000bp windows) with above-median region in green, and below-median regions in red.

The bacterium is highly virulent, such that its isolation and cell culture are done only in a laboratory facility with biosafety level 3. Unlike other bacteria which can easily grow on different culture media, rickettsiales can be cultured only in living cells. O. tsutsugamushi specifically can be grown only in the yolk sacs of developing chicken embryos and in cultured cell lines such as HeLa, BHK, Vero, and L929. In contrast to Rickettsia species which reside in the nucleus of the host cell, O. tsutsugamushi mostly grows within the cytoplasm of the host cell. Genetically, it differs from other Rickettsia by only 9%. Even though adaptation to obligate intracellular parasitism among bacteria generally results in a reduced genome, it has a genome size of about 2.0–2.7 Mb depending on the strains, which is comparatively larger than those of other rickettsiales – two times larger than that of Rickettsia prowazekii, the most well-known member. The entire genome is distributed in a single circular chromosome. Whole genome sequences are available only for Ikeda and Boryong strains, both from the Republic of Korea. The genome of the Ikeda strain is 2,008,987 base pairs (bp) long, and contains 1,967 protein-coding genes. The Boryong strain is larger with 2,127,051 bp and 2,179 protein-coding genes.

Genome comparison shows only 657 core genes among the different strains. With about 42-47% of repetitive sequences, O. tsutsugamushi has the most highly repeated bacterial genome sequenced as of 2013. The repeated DNA sequence includes short repetitive sequences, transposable elements (including insertion sequence elements, miniature inverted-repeat transposable elements, a Group II intron), and a greatly amplified Integrative and Conjugative Element (ICE) called the rickettsial amplified genetic element (RAGE). RAGE is also found in other rickettsial bacteria. In O. tsutsugamushi, however, RAGE contains a number of genes including tra genes typical of type IV secretion systems and gene for ankyrin repeat–containing protein. Ankyrin repeat–containing proteins are secreted through a type I secretion system into the host cell. The precise role of type IV secretion system in O. tsutsugamushi is not known. It may be involved in horizontal gene transfer between the different strains.

=== Life cycle and transmission ===
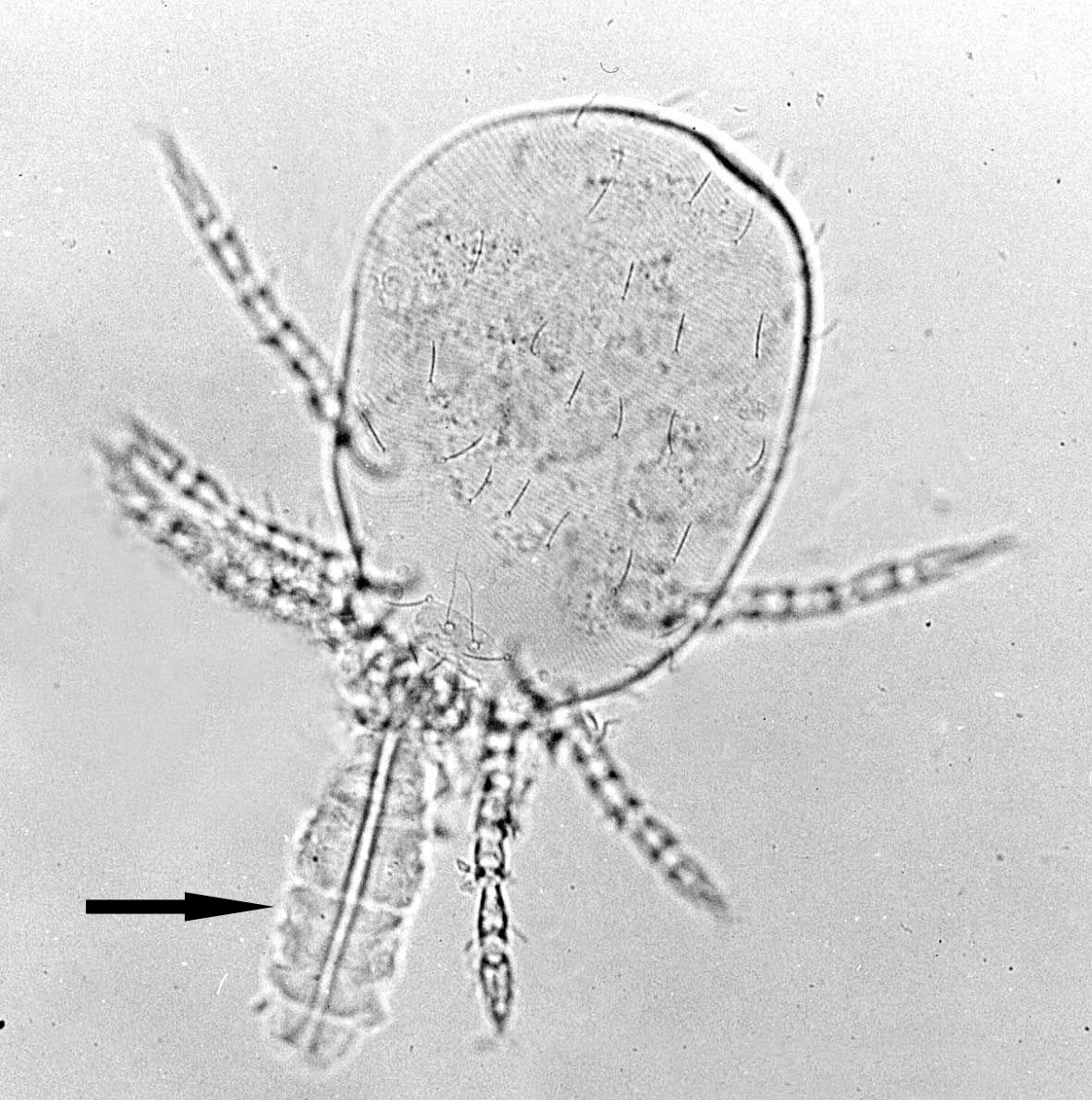
Chigger with its stylostome (arrowhead), the feeding apparatus.

Orientia tsutsugamushi is naturally transmitted in the mite population belonging to the genus Leptotrombidium. It can be transmitted by a female to its eggs through the process called transovarial transmission, and from the eggs to larvae and adults through the process of transstadial transmission. Thus, the bacterial life cycle is maintained entirely in mites. Infection to rodents and humans is an accidental transmission from the bite of mite larvae, and not required for reproduction or survival of the bacterium. In fact, in humans the transmission is stopped, and the bacterium meets a dead end. However, uninfected mites can acquire the infection from infected rodents.

In rodent and human infections, Leptotrombidium deliense is the most common vector of O. tsutsugamushi. L. pallidum, L. fletcheri and L. scutellare are also carriers in many countries. In addition, L. akamushi is an endemic carrier in Japan, L. chiangraiensis and L. imphalum in Thailand, L. gaohuensis in China, and L. arenicola in Malaysia and Indonesia. In parts of India, a different mite species, Schoengastiella ligula is also a major vector. The life cycle of mites consists of egg, prelarva, larva, protonymph, deutonymph, tritonymph, and adult. The larvae, commonly referred to as chiggers, are the only ectoparasitic stage feeding on the body fluids of rodents and other opportunistic mammals. Thus, they are the only stage in the life of mites that transmit the infection. Wild rats of the genus Rattus are the principal natural hosts of the chiggers. Chiggers feed only once on a mammalian host. The feeding usually takes 2 to 4 days. In contrast to most parasites, they do not feed on blood, but instead on the body fluid through the hair follicles or skin pores. In the process of feeding, they create a stylostome, which is a tube formed by solidified saliva. Their saliva can dissolve the host tissue around the feeding site, so that they ingest the liquefied tissue. O. tsutsugamushi is present in the salivary glands of mites and is released into the host tissue during this feeding.

=== Cellular invasion ===
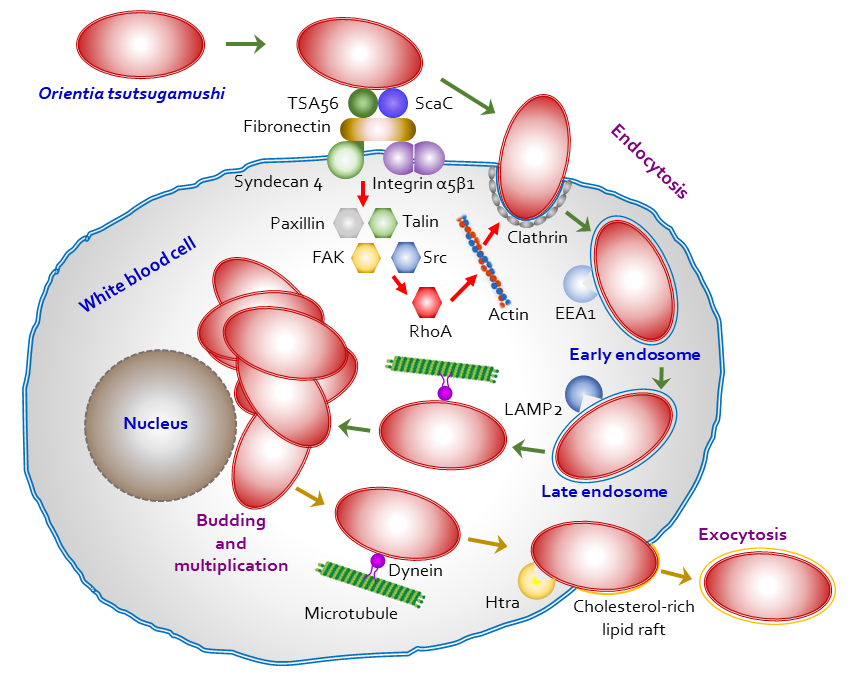
Mechanism of cell invasion by O. tsutsugamushi.

Orientia tsutsugamushi initially attacks the myelocytes (young white blood cells) in the area of inoculation, and then the endothelial cells lining the vasculature. In the blood circulation, it targets professional phagocytes, white blood cells) such as dendritic cells and macrophages in all organs as the secondary targets. The parasite first attaches itself to the target cells using surface proteoglycans present on the host cell and bacterial surface proteins such as type specific protein 56 (or type specific antigen, TSA56) and surface cell antigens (ScaA and ScaC, which are membrane transporter proteins). These proteins interact with the host fibronectin to induce phagocytosis (the process of ingesting the bacterium). The ability to actually enter the host cell depends on integrin-mediated signaling and reorganisation of the actin cytoskeleton.

Orientia tsutsugamushi has a special adaptation for surviving in the host cell by evading the host immune reaction. Once it interacts with the host cells, it causes the host cell membrane to form a transportation bubble called a clathrin-coated vesicle by which it gets transported into the cytoplasm. Inside the cytoplasm, it makes an exit from the vesicle (now known as an endosome) before the endosome is destroyed (in the process of cell-eating called autophagy) by the lysosomes. It then moves towards the nucleus, specifically at the perinuclear region, where it starts to grow and multiply. Unlike other closely related bacteria which use actin-mediated processes for movement in the cytoplasm (called intracellular trafficking or transport), O. tsutsugamushi is unusual in using microtubule-mediated processes similar to those employed by viruses such as adenoviruses and herpes simplex viruses. Further, the escape (exocytosis) from an infected host cell is also unusual. It forms another vesicle using the host cell membrane, gives rise to a small bud, and releases itself from the host cell surface while still enclosed in the vesicle. The membrane-bound bacterium is formed by interaction between cholesterol-rich lipid rafts as well as HtrA, a 47-kDa protein on the bacterial surface. However, the process of budding and importance of the membrane-bound bacterium are not yet understood.

=== Strains ===
Orientia tsutsugamushi is a diverse species of bacteria. Ida A. Bengtson of the United States Public Health Service was the first to note the existence of different strains using antigen-antibody interaction (complement fixation test) in 1944. She observed that different strains had varying degree of virulence, and that the antibodies in the blood sera of patients cross-react to different strains. By 1946, she established that there were three principal strains (serotypes), namely Karp (from New Guinea), Gilliam (from India) and Seerangay (from British Malaya). Akira Shishido described the Kato strain, in addition to Gilliam and Karp, in Japan in 1958. Since then, six basic antigenic strains are recognised, namely Gilliam, Karp, Kato, Shimokoshi, Kawasaki, and Kuroki. Karp is the most abundant strain, accounting for about 50% of all infections. In Korea, the major strain is Boryong. As of 2009, more than 20 different strains have been established in humans based on antigenic variation using serological tests such as complement fixation and immunofluorescence assay. The number is much higher if the strains in rodents and mites are taken into account. For example, a study in Japan in 1994 reported 32 strains, 14 from human patients, 12 from wild rodents, and 6 from trombiculid mites. The different strains exert different levels of virulence, and the most virulent is KN-3, which is predominant among wild rodents. Another study in 1996 reported 40 strains. Genetic methods have revealed even greater complexity than had been previously described (for example, Gilliam is further divided into Gilliam and JG types). Due to immunological differences of the serotypes, simultaneous and repeated infection with different strains is possible.

==== Antigenic variation ====
Orientia tsutsugamushi has four major surface-membrane proteins (antigens) having molecular weights 22 kDa, 47 kDa, 56 kDa and 110 kDa. A 56-kDa type specific antigen (TSA56) is the most important because it is not produced by any other bacteria, and is responsible for making the genetic diversity in different strains. It accounts for about 10–15% of the total cell proteins. The 22-kDa, 47-kDa or 110-kDa antigens are not strain specific so that TSA56 is the main target in sophisticated diagnostic tests such as immunoblotting, ELISA and DNA analysis. The protein assists the adhesion and entry of the bacterium into host cells, as well as evasion of the host's immune reaction. It varies in size from 516 to 540 amino acid residues between different strains, and its gene is approximately 1,550 base pairs long. Its gene contains four hypervariable regions, indicating that it synthesises many antigenically different proteins. There are also 11-kDa and 60-kDa proteins inside the bacterium which are very similar to GroES and GroEL of the bacterium Escherichia coli, but not that of Rickettsia species. GroES and GroEL are heat shock proteins belonging to the family of molecular chaperones in bacteria. DNA analyses have shown that the GroES and GroEL genes are indeed present in O. tsutsugamushi with slight variation in different strains, and they produce the 11-kDa and 60-kDa proteins.

== Disease ==
Orientia tsutsugamushi causes a complex and potentially life-threatening disease known as scrub typhus. Infection starts when chiggers bite on the skin during their feeding. The bacteria are deposited at the site of feeding (inoculation), where they multiply. They cause progressive tissue damage (necrosis), which leads to formation of an eschar on the skin. Necrosis progresses to inflammation of the blood vessels, called vasculitis. This in turn causes inflammation of the lymph nodes, called lymphadenopathy. Within a few days, vasculitis extends to various organs including the liver, brain, kidney, meninges and lungs. The disease is responsible for nearly a quarter of all the febrile (high fever) illness in endemic areas. Mortality in severe cases or due to improper treatment or misdiagnosis may be as high as 30–70%. About 6% of infected people die untreated, and 1.4% of the patients die even with medical treatment. Moreover, the death rate can be as high as 14% with neurological problems and 24% with multi-organ dysfunction among treated patients. In cases of misdiagnosis and failure of treatment, systemic complications rapidly develop including acute respiratory distress syndrome, acute kidney failure, encephalitis, gastrointestinal bleeding, hepatitis, meningitis, myocarditis, pancreatitis, pneumonia, septic shock, subacute thyroiditis, and multiple organ dysfunction syndrome. Harmful effects involving multiple organ failure and neurological impairment are difficult to treat, and can cause lifelong debilitation or be directly fatal. The central nervous system is often affected and results in various complications including cerebellitis, cranial nerve palsies, meningoencephalitis, plexopathy, transverse myelitis, and Guillan-Barré syndrome. Death rates due to complications can be up to 14% in brain infections, and 24% with multiple organ failure. In India, scrub typhus has become the major cause of acute encephalitis syndrome, which was earlier caused mainly by a viral infection, Japanese encephalitis.

=== Epidemiology ===
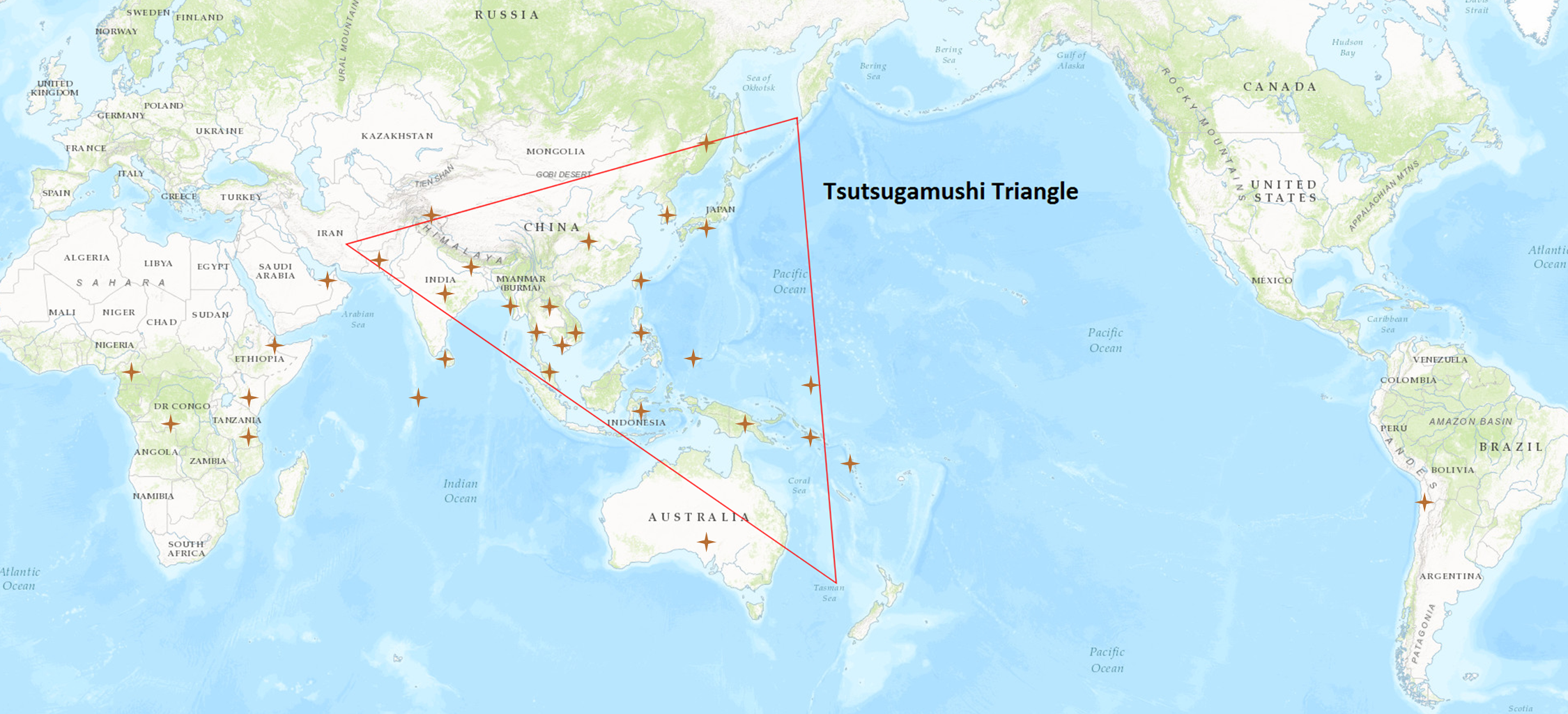
Map showing the Tsutsugamushi Triangle. Countries with human cases are labeled with a star.

The World Health Organization in 1999 stated that:

Scrub typhus is probably one of the most underdiagnosed and underreported febrile illnesses requiring hospitalization in the region. The absence of definitive signs and symptoms combined with a general dependence upon serological tests make the differentiation of scrub typhus from other common febrile diseases such as murine typhus, typhoid fever and leptospirosis quite difficult.

Scrub typhus is historically endemic to the Asia-Pacific region, covering the Russian Far East and Korea in the north, to northern Australia in the south, and Afghanistan in the west, including islands of the western Pacific Oceans such as Japan, Taiwan, Philippines, Papua New Guinea, Indonesia, Sri Lanka, and the Indian Subcontinent. This geographic region is popularly called the Tsutsugamushi Triangle. However, it has spread to Africa, Europe and South America. One billion people are estimated to be at risk of infection at any moment and an average of one million cases occur every year in the Tsutsugamushi Triangle. The burden of scrub typhus in rural areas of Asia is huge, accounting for up to 20% of febrile sickness in hospital, and seroprevalence (positive infection on blood test) over 50% of the population. More than one-fifth of the population carry the bacterial antibodies, i.e. they had been infected, in endemic areas. South Korea has the highest level incidence (with its highest of 59.7 infections out of 100,000 people in 2013), followed by Japan, Thailand, and China at top of the list. The age group of 60–69 years is at highest risk of infection. Higher infection (57.3%) is seen in females compared to males (42.7%). Farmers are most vulnerable, accounting for 70% of the cases in China. The disease is more prevalent in rural areas, but there is a rapid increase in urban areas. For example, in Korea, the annual incidence increased 21-fold between 2003 and 2013 in metropolitan areas.

=== Diagnosis ===
==== Symptoms ====
The main symptom of O. tsutsugamushi infection is high (febrile) fever; however, the symptom is similar to other vector-borne tropical diseases such as malaria, leptospirosis, typhoid, murine typhus, chikungunya, and dengue fever. This makes precise clinical diagnosis difficult, which often leads to misdiagnosis. The initial indications are fever with chills, associated with headache, muscle pain (myalgia), sweating and vomiting. The appearance of symptoms (the incubation period) takes between 6 and 21 days. A simple visual diagnosis is the presence of an inflamed scar-like scab called eschar, which is regarded as "the most useful diagnostic clue in patients with acute febrile illness". Eschar is formed on the skin where an infected mite bit, usually seen in the armpit, groin or any abdominal area. In rare cases, it can be seen on the cheek, ear lobe and dorsum of the feet. But, the problem is that eschar is not always present; at the highest record, only 55% of scrub typhus patients had eschar during an outbreak in south India. Also, eschar is not specific to scrub typhus, occurring in other rickettsial diseases such as Rocky Mountain spotted fever, Brazilian spotted fever, and Indian tick typhus. Using DNA analysis by advanced polymerase chain reaction, different rickettsial infections can be identified from eschars.

==== Blood tests ====
Suspected infections are confirmed with serological tests. O. tsutsugamushi is most often detected from blood serum using the Weil–Felix test. Weil–Felix is the simplest and most rapid test, but it is not sensitive or specific, as it detects any kind of rickettsial infection. More sensitive tests such as rapid immunochromatographic test (RICT), immunofluorescence assays (IFA), ELISA, and DNA analysis using polymerase chain reaction (PCR) are used. IFA is regarded as the gold standard test, as it gives a reliable result; however, it is expensive and not specific for different rickettsial bacteria. ELISA and PCR can detect O. tsutsugamushi-specific proteins such as the TSA56 and GroEL, so that they are highly specific and sensitive. On the other hand, they are highly sophisticated and expensive techniques.

=== Treatment ===
Orientia tsutsugamushi infection can be treated with antibiotics such as azithromycin, chloramphenicol, doxycycline, rifampicin, roxithromycin, and tetracyclin. Doxycycline is the most commonly used and is considered as the drug of choice because of its high efficacy and quick action. But, in pregnant women and babies, it is contraindicated, and azithromycin is the drug of choice. In Southeast Asia, where doxycycline and chloramphenicol resistance have been experienced, azithromycin is recommended. A randomized controlled trial and systematic review showed that azithromycin is the safest medication.

=== Vaccine ===
Several vaccines have been developed but there are no licensed products. The first vaccines were developed in the late 1940s, but failed in clinical trials. Considered an ideal target, the unique TSA56 itself is highly variable in its chemical composition in different strains. An effective vaccine for one strain is not useful for another. An ideal vaccine should give protection to all the strains present locally. This complexity makes it difficult to produce a usable vaccine. A vaccine targeting the 47-kDa outer membrane protein (OMP) is a promising candidate with experimental success in mice against the Boryong strain. Combined targeting of TSA56 and ScaA is also a good candidate for mixed-strain infection.

== Immunity ==
There is no lasting immunity to O. tsutsugamushi infection. Antigenic variation prevents the development of cross immunity to the various strains of O. tsutsugamushi. An infected individual may develop a short-term immunity but that disappears after a few months, and immunity to one strain does not confer immunity to another. An immunisation experiment was done in 1950 in which 16 volunteers still developed the infection after 11–25 months of primary infection. It is now known that the longevity of immunity depends on the strains of the bacterium. When reinfection occurs with the same strain as the previous infection, there can be immunity for 5–6 years in monkeys. But in humans, immunity declines after one year, and disappears within two years.
