= Eutrombicula batatas =

Scientific classification
- Kingdom: Animalia
- Phylum: Arthropoda
- Subphylum: Chelicerata
- Class: Arachnida
- Order: Trombidiformes
- Family: Trombiculidae
- Genus: Eutrombicula
- Species: E. batatas

Binomial name
- Eutrombicula batatas (Linnaeus, 1758)

Synonyms
- Acarus batatas Linnaeus, 1758; Trombicula batatas

Species of mite

Eutrombicula batatas is a species of chigger (trombiculid mite).

Host species include:

Didelphimorphia

- Didelphis marsupialis in Venezuela
- Lutreolina crassicaudata in Venezuela
- Marmosa robinsoni in Venezuela
- Marmosops fuscatus in Venezuela
- Monodelphis brevicaudata in Venezuela

Chiroptera

- Micronycteris megalotis in Venezuela
- Noctilio albiventris in Venezuela

Cetartiodactyla

- Odocoileus virginianus in Georgia

Lagomorpha

- Sylvilagus floridanus in Venezuela

Rodentia

- Holochilus sciureus in Bolivia and Venezuela
- Makalata didelphoides in Bolivia
- Necromys lenguarum in Bolivia
- Nectomys sp. in Venezuela
- Oecomys sydandersoni in Bolivia
- Oligoryzomys fulvescens in Venezuela
- Oligoryzomys microtis in Bolivia
- Oryzomys palustris in Florida
- Pattonomys semivillosus in Venezuela
- Proechimys semispinosus in Venezuela
- Rattus rattus in Florida and Venezuela
- Sigmodon alstoni in Venezuela
- Sigmodon hirsutus in Venezuela
- Sigmodon sp. in Veracruz
- Zygodontomys brevicauda in Panama and Venezuela

Primates

- Homo sapiens

== Literature cited ==
- Brennan, J.M. 1970. Chiggers from the Bolivian-Brazilian border (Acarina: Trombiculidae) (subscription required). Journal of Parasitology 56:807–812.
- Brennan, J.M. and Reed, J.T. 1974. The genus Eutrombicula in Venezuela (Acarina: Trombiculidae) (subscription required). Journal of Parasitology 60(4):699–711.
- Carleton, M.D., Emmons, L.H. and Musser, G.G. 2009. A new species of the rodent genus Oecomys (Cricetidae: Sigmodontinae: Oryzomyini) from eastern Bolivia, with emended definitions of O. concolor (Wagner) and O. mamorae (Thomas). American Museum Novitates 3661:1–32.
- Estébanes-González, M.L. and Cervantes, F.A. 2005. Mites and ticks associated with some small mammals in Mexico (subscription required). International Journal of Acarology 31(1):23–37.
- Voss, R.S. 1991. An introduction to the neotropical muroid rodent genus Zygodontomys. Bulletin of the American Museum of Natural History 210:1–113.
- Wilson, N. and Durden, L.A. 2003. Ectoparasites of terrestrial vertebrates inhabiting the Georgia Barrier Islands, USA: an inventory and preliminary biogeographical analysis (subscription required). Journal of Biogeography 30(8):1207–1220.
- Worth, C.B. 1950. Observations on ectoparasites of some small mammals in Everglades National Park and Hillsborough County, Florida (subscription required). The Journal of Parasitology 36(4):326–335.
