= Beamerella (disambiguation) =

Beamerella is a valid genus of chiggers.

Beamerella may also refer to:

- Beamerella, a genus of leafhoppers now regarded as a synonym of Beamerana
- Beamerella, a genus of true bugs now regarded as a synonym of Larinocerus
