= Leptotrombidium =

Scientific classification
- Kingdom: Animalia
- Phylum: Arthropoda
- Subphylum: Chelicerata
- Class: Arachnida
- Order: Trombidiformes
- Family: Trombiculidae
- Tribe: Trombiculini
- Genus: Leptotrombidium; Nagayo et al., 1916

Genus of mites

Leptotrombidium (/ˌlɛptoʊtrɒmˈbɪdiəm/) is a genus of mites in the family Trombiculidae, that are able to infect humans with scrub typhus (Orientia tsutsugamushi infection) through their bite. The larval form (called chiggers) feeds on rodents, but also occasionally humans and other large mammals. They are related to the harvest mites of the North America and Europe.

Originally, rodents were thought to be the main reservoir for O. tsutsugamushi and the mites were merely vectors of infection: that is, the mites only transferred the contagion from the rodents to humans. However, the mites are now known to only feed once in their lifetimes, which means that transmission from rodent to human via the mites is impossible (for it to have been possible, the mite would have to feed at least twice, once on the infected rodent and again on the human who would then be infected). Instead, the bacterium persists in the mites through transovarial transmission, where infected mites transmit the infection to their unborn offspring. Leptotrombidium mites are therefore both vector and reservoir for O. tsutsugamushi. The infection predominantly affects female mites, and does not appear to otherwise harm the mites.

== Life history ==
The larvae are pale orange in colour and feed on liquified skin tissue, not blood, as their mouth parts (chelicerae) are too short to reach the blood vessels. They have three pairs of legs. The larvae most commonly target rodents, but also attach to humans. For humans, the bite is painless, but pain commonly develops only after the larvae detach from the skin, leaving red papules that may then develop into an eschar.

The larval stage lasts for 1 to 2 weeks. After feeding, the larvae drop to the ground and become nymphs. Nymphs are brick-red in colour and have four pairs of legs. The nymphal stage lasts for 1 to 3 weeks. Nymphs mature into adults which have four pairs of legs, the first pair being the largest. They are harmless to humans. In the postlarval stage, they are not parasitic and feed on plant materials. Females lay eggs singly, which hatch in about a week. Lifespan of the adult is about 6 months.

== Taxonomy ==
- L. akamushi is endemic to Japan and is the reservoir for the Kato serotype of O. tsutsugamushi;
- L. deliense is the main vector in the south of China and in Thailand; it is also endemic to Litchfield Park, in the Northern Territory, Australia, where is carries the Litchfield serotype.
- L. pallidum is endemic to Japan and is the reservoir for Karp and Gilliam serotypes;
- L. scutellare is endemic to Japan and is the reservoir for Kawasaki and Kuroki serotypes.
