= Eutrombicula =

Scientific classification
- Kingdom: Animalia
- Phylum: Arthropoda
- Subphylum: Chelicerata
- Class: Arachnida
- Order: Trombidiformes
- Family: Trombiculidae
- Tribe: Trombiculini
- Genus: Eutrombicula; Ewing, 1938

Genus of mites

Eutrombicula is a genus of mites in the family Trombiculidae. The species of this genus are found throughout North America, and Australia.

The genus was first described by Henry Ellsworth Ewing in 1938.

Two genera of chigger mites, each containing many species, are of concern to U.S. deployed military forces. They are Eutrombicula and Leptotrombidium. Chiggers in the genus Eutrombicula, such as Eutrombicula alfreddugesi, do not transmit any known pathogens to people, but they can cause irritating bites, dermatitis and severe itching when they feed on the unsuspecting host. They are widely distributed in the Western Hemisphere, and Europe. By comparison chiggers in the genus Leptotrombidium are the vectors of scrub typhus throughout Asia and portions of Australia. The bite of Leptotrombidium often does not itch, or at least not as intensely, as those of Eutrombicula. Also, a black necrotic lesion known as an eschar develops where the chigger fed.

== Australian species ==
Species in the genus, Eutrombicula, recognised at the Australian Faunal Directory are:

- Eutrombicula hirsti (Sambon, 1927)
- Eutrombicula macropus (Womersley, 1936)
- Eutrombicula rara (Walch, 1924)
- Eutrombicula samboni (Womersley, 1939)
- Eutrombicula sarcina (Womersley, 1944)
- Eutrombicula southcotti (Womersley & Audy, 1957)
- Eutrombicula thori (Womersley, 1952)
- Eutrombicula tovelli (Womersley, 1952)
- Eutrombicula vandiemeni (Domrow, 1962)

== Non-Australian species ==
Additional species listed by BioLib.

- Eutrombicula alfreddugesi (Oudemans, 1902)
- Eutrombicula chiricahuae Bennett & Loomis, 1981
- Eutrombicula conantae Goff, 1984
- Eutrombicula gigarara (Brown, 1997)
- Eutrombicula lawrencei (Wharton & Fuller, 1952)
- Eutrombicula onyongensis Goff & Easton, 1989
- Eutrombicula orlovensis Hushcha, 1966
- Eutrombicula wichmanni (Oudemans, 1905)
- Eutrombicula wuyiensis Song & Wang, 1986
- Eutrombicula xixie (Wen & Xiang, 1984)
- Eutrombicula yunkeri Geoff & Ingels, 1983
