= Eutrombicula samboni =

Scientific classification
- Domain: Eukaryota
- Kingdom: Animalia
- Phylum: Arthropoda
- Subphylum: Chelicerata
- Class: Arachnida
- Order: Trombidiformes
- Family: Trombiculidae
- Genus: Eutrombicula
- Species: E. samboni

Binomial name
- Eutrombicula samboni (Womersley, 1939)

Species of mite

Eutrombicula samboni (common name - teatree itch-mite) is a species of mite in the family Trombiculidae, found in South Australia.

The genus was first described as Trombicula samboni by Herbert Womersley in 1939.

The larva of these mites ('chiggers') embed themselves in host mammals, and for human hosts, the resulting skin irritation has been known as 'tea-tree itch' or 'duck-shooters itch'. Other apparent hosts are horses, cattle and sheep.
