= Beamerella =

Scientific classification
- Domain: Eukaryota
- Kingdom: Animalia
- Phylum: Arthropoda
- Subphylum: Chelicerata
- Class: Arachnida
- Order: Trombidiformes
- Family: Trombiculidae
- Tribe: Trombiculini
- Genus: Beamerella; Brennan, 1958

Species
- Beamerella acutascuta Brennan, 1958; Beamerella latiscuta Goff and Brennan, 1978; Beamerella subacutascuta (Vercammen-Grandjean, 1967)

Genus of mites

Beamerella is a genus of chiggers belonging to the family Trombiculidae.
