= Trombiculini =

Scientific classification
- Domain: Eukaryota
- Kingdom: Animalia
- Phylum: Arthropoda
- Subphylum: Chelicerata
- Class: Arachnida
- Order: Trombidiformes
- Family: Trombiculidae
- Subfamily: Trombiculinae
- Tribe: Trombiculini; Ewing, 1929

Genera
- See text

Tribe of mites

Trombiculini is a tribe of chiggers belonging to the family Trombiculidae.

== Genera ==
The following genera are currently accepted within Trombiculini:

- Afrotrombicula Kolebinova and Vercammen-Grandjean, 1978
- Alexfainia Yunker and Jones, 1961
- Ancoracarus Takahashi, Misumi and Takahashi, 2012
- Anomalaspis Brennan, 1952
- Aplodontophila Wrenn and Maser, 1981
- Atelepalme Brennan and Reed, 1973
- Audytrombicula Vercammen-Grandjean, 1963
- Babiangia Southcott, 1954
- Batmanacarus Bassini-Silva, Jacinavicius and Ochoa in Bassini-Silva et al., 2021
- Beamerella Brennan, 1958
- Blanciella Vercammen-Grandjean, 1960
- Blankaartia Oudemans, 1911
- Blix Brennan and Yunker, 1966
- Boshkerria Fauran, 1959
- Bramkeria Bassini-Silva, Jacinavicius and Ochoa in Bassini-Silva et al., 2021
- Brennanacarus Goff, Yunker and Wheeler, 1987
- Brygoovia Stekolnikov and Fain, 2004
- Buclypeus Brennan, 1972
- Caamembecaia Gazêta, Amorim, Bossi, Linhares and Serra-Freire, 2006
- Carebareia Goff and Brennan, 1977
- Chiroptella Vercammen-Grandjean, 1960
- Crotiscus Ewing, 1944
- Crotonasis Brennan and Yunker, 1966
- Cubanothrombidium Feider, 1983
- Dolichotrombicula Feider, 1977
- Dongyangsha Wen, 1984
- Ericotrombidium Vercammen-Grandjean, 1965
- Eusaperium Brennan, 1970
- Euschoengastoides Loomis, 1954
- Eutrombicula Ewing, 1938
- Fereus Brennan and Jones, 1961
- Fonsecia Radford, 1942
- Fonsecula Loomis, 1966
- Grandjeana Kocak and Kemal, 2009
- Heaslipia Ewing, 1944
- Heterotectum Feider, 1983
- Hexidionis Vercammen-Grandjean and Loomis, 1967
- Hirsutiella Schluger and Vysotzkaja, 1970
- Hoffmannina Brennan and Jones, 1959
- Hooperella Vercammen-Grandjean, 1967
- Huabangsha Wen, Yu and Yang, 1980
- Hyponeocula Vercammen-Grandjean, 1960
- Hypotrombidium Vercammen-Grandjean, 1966
- Iguanacarus Vercammen-Grandjean, 1965
- Intercutestrix Brennan and Yunker, 1966
- Ipotrombicula Womersley, 1952
- Kaaia Brennan, 1958
- Kepkatrombicula Kudryashova and Stekolnikov, 2010
- Lacertacarus Schluger and Vasilieva, 1977
- Laotrombicula Stekolnikov, 2014
- Leptotrombidium Nagayo, Miyagawa, Mitamura and Imamura, 1916
- Lorillatum Nadchatram, 1963
- Marcandrea Vercammen-Grandjean, 1960
- Microtrombicula Ewing, 1950
- Miyatrombicula Sasa, Kawashima and Egashira, 1952
- Multigniella Vercammen-Grandjean and Fain, 1957
- Muritrombicula Yu, Gong and Tao, 1981
- Myotrombicula Womersley and Heaslip, 1943
- Myxacarus Brennan and Yunker, 1966
- Nahuacarus Bassini-Silva, Jacinavicius and Welbourn in Bassini-Silva et al., 2020
- Neotrombicula Hirst, 1925
- Neotrombiculoides Vercammen-Grandjean, 1960
- Novotrombicula Womersley and Kohls, 1947
- Nycteranistes Brennan and Reed, 1973
- Oaxacarus Goff and Spicer, 1980
- Octasternala Brown, 1990
- Otorhinophila Wrenn and Loomis, 1967
- Oudemansidium Vercammen-Grandjean, 1967
- Parasecia Loomis, 1966
- Paratrombicula Goff and Whitaker, 1984
- Peltoculus Brennan, 1972
- Pentagonaspis Vercammen-Grandjean and André, 1966
- Pentagonotectum Feider, 1983
- Pentidionis Vercammen-Grandjean and Loomis, 1967
- Perates Brennan and Dalmat, 1960
- Perissopalla Brennan and White, 1960
- Phalcophila Brennan and Reed, 1973
- Poliremotus Brennan and Goff, 1978
- Polylopadium Brennan and Jones, 1961
- Pseudoblankaartia Fuller and Wharton, 1951
- Rhinibius Brennan and Yunker, 1969
- Rudnicula Vercammen-Grandjean, 1964
- Sambonacarus Stekolnikov, 2021
- Sasatrombicula Vercammen-Grandjean, 1960
- Sauriscus Lawrence, 1949
- Speleocola Lipovsky, 1952
- Speotrombicula Ewing, 1946
- Striatiscuta Y. Hsu and Y. C. Hsu, 1982
- Tanautarsala Brown, 2007
- Tauffliebiella Vercammen-Grandjean, 1960
- Tecomatlana Hoffmann, 1947
- Tectumpilosum Feider, 1983
- Tenotrombicula Vercammen-Grandjean, 1965
- Teratothrix Brennan and Goff, 1978
- Toritrombicula Sasa, Hayashi and Kawashima, 1953
- Trombicula Berlese, 1905
- Trombiculindus Radford, 1948
- Vanidicus Brennan and Jones, 1961
- Vatacarus Southcott, 1957
- Vercammenia Audy and Domrow, 1957
- Vergrandia Yunker and Jones, 1961
- Whartonacarus Vercammen-Grandjean, 1960
- Willmannium Vercammen-Grandjean and Langston, 1976
- Xinjiangsha Wen and Shao, 1984
- Zumptrombicula Vercammen-Grandjean, 1967
