= Guntheria coorongensis =

Scientific classification
- Domain: Eukaryota
- Kingdom: Animalia
- Phylum: Arthropoda
- Subphylum: Chelicerata
- Class: Arachnida
- Order: Trombidiformes
- Family: Trombiculidae
- Genus: Guntheria
- Species: G. coorongensis

Binomial name
- Guntheria coorongensis (Hirst, 1929)

Synonyms
- Schongastia coorongense Neoschongastia coorongense Schongastia ( Ascoschongastia) coorongense Guntheria ( Derrickiella) coorongensis

Species of mite

Guntheria coorongensis is a species of mite in the family Trombiculidae, found from the tip of Cape York in Queensland to South Australia.

The genus was first described as Schoengastia coorongense by Hirst in 1929. The species epithet indicates that it comes from the Coorong.

The larva of these mites ('chiggers') when feeding embed themselves in host animals, and for human hosts, the resulting skin irritation has been known as 'tea-tree itch' or 'duck-shooters itch'. Host animals recorded include native rats and marsupials: (from Queensland): Antechinus stuartii, other Antechinus species, Rattus lutreolus lutreolus, R. sordidus sordidus, R. leucopus leucopus; (from Victoria), A. swainsonii and A. minimus; (from South Australia): R.fuscipes greyii. This mite has also been listed as a parasite of the Northern Quoll in the Northern Territory.
