= List of military slang terms =

Military slang is a colloquial language used by and associated with members of various military forces. This page lists slang words or phrases that originate with military forces, are used exclusively by military personnel or are strongly associated with military organizations.

== Acronym slang ==
A number of military slang terms are acronyms. These include SNAFU, SUSFU, FUBAR, and similar terms used by various branches of the United States military during World War II.

=== BOHICA ===
BOHICA stands for Bend Over, Here It Comes Again. The meaning is that something undesirable is going to happen again and that there is not much else one can do other than just endure it.

The Log, the humor magazine written by and for Midshipmen at the United States Naval Academy, featured a series of comics entitled "The Bohica Brothers", dating back to the early 1970s.

=== FAFO ===
FAFO stands for Fuck Around and Find Out (alternatively Fool Around and Find Out), meaning to do something (usually ill-advised or stupid) and discover the consequences of that action, in some cases involving serious injury or even fatality.

=== FUBAR ===
FUBAR (Fucked/Fouled Up Beyond All/Any Repair/Recognition/Reason), like SNAFU and SUSFU, dates from World War II. The Oxford English Dictionary lists Yank, the Army Weekly magazine (1944, 7 Jan. p. 8) as its earliest citation: "The FUBAR squadron. ‥ FUBAR? It means 'Fouled Up Beyond All Recognition," referring to unpaid military personnel with erroneous paperwork.

=== CHIPS ===
CHIPS (Causing Havoc In Peoples Streets) is a slang term used by the British Army in urban warfare operations, usually in conjunction with FISH (Fighting In Someone's House) as in Fish & Chips.

=== FUBU ===
FUBU (Fucked/Fouled Up Beyond all Understanding) was also used during World War II.

=== FRED ===
FRED (Fucking Ridiculous Eating Device) is a slang term in the Australian Army used to refer to the Field Ration Eating Device attached to each ration pack.

=== SNAFU ===
SNAFU is widely used to stand for the sarcastic expression Situation Normal: All Fucked Up, as a well-known example of military acronym slang. However, the military acronym originally stood for "Status Nominal: All Fucked Up." It is sometimes bowdlerized to all fouled up or similar. It means that the situation is bad, but that this is a normal state of affairs. It is typically used in a joking manner to describe something that is working as intended, but doesn't necessarily work well when used for its intended purpose. The acronym is believed to have originated in the United States Marine Corps during World War II.

Time magazine used the term in their June 16, 1942, issue: "Last week U.S. citizens knew that gasoline rationing and rubber requisitioning were snafu." Most reference works, including the Random House Webster's Unabridged Dictionary, supply an origin date of 1940–1944, generally attributing it to the United States Army.

Rick Atkinson ascribes the origin of SNAFU, FUBAR, and a bevy of other terms to cynical G.I.s ridiculing the Army's penchant for acronyms.

Private Snafu is the title character of a series of military instructional films, most of which were written by Theodor "Dr. Seuss" Geisel, Philip D. Eastman, and Munro Leaf.

In modern usage, snafu is sometimes used as an interjection, although it is mostly now used as a noun. Snafu also sometimes refers to a bad situation, mistake, or cause of the trouble. It is more commonly used in modern vernacular to describe running into an error or problem that is large and unexpected. For example, in 2005, The New York Times published an article titled "Hospital Staff Cutback Blamed for Test Result Snafu".

The attribution of SNAFU to the American military is not universally accepted: it has also been attributed to the British, although the Oxford English Dictionary gives its origin and first recorded use as the U.S. military.

In 1946, as part of a wider study of military slang, Frederick Elkin noted: "...[there] are a few acceptable substitutes, such as 'screw up' or 'mess up', but these do not have the emphasis value of the obscene equivalent." He considered the expression SNAFU to be: "...a caricature of Army direction. The soldier resignedly accepts his own less responsible position and expresses his cynicism at the inefficiency of Army authority." He also noted that "the expression … is coming into general civilian use."

=== An Imperial FU ===
An Imperial FU (An Imperial Fuck Up) was used during World War I by soldiers of the outlying British Empire in reference to odd/conflicting orders from British authorities. Note that during World War I, the British Empire had an Imperial War Cabinet, and the troops from Australia were called the Australian Imperial Force (AIF), not to be confused with the AEF, the American Expeditionary Forces of WWI, or the Allied Expeditionary Force of WWII.

=== SUSFU ===
SUSFU (Situation Unchanged: Still Fucked Up) is closely related to SNAFU.

SNAFU and SUSFU were first recorded in American Notes and Queries in their September 13, 1941, issue.

=== TARFU ===
TARFU (Totally And Royally Fucked Up or Things Are Really Fucked Up) was also used during World War II.

The 1944 U.S. Army animated shorts Three Brothers and Private Snafu Presents Seaman Tarfu In The Navy (both directed by Friz Freleng), feature the characters Private Snafu, Private Fubar, and Seaman Tarfu (with a cameo by Bugs Bunny).

== Tommy and the Poor Bloody Infantry ==
Tommy Atkins (often just Tommy) is slang for a common soldier in the British Army, but many soldiers preferred the terms PBI (poor bloody infantry) "P.B.I." was a pseudonym of a contributor to the First World War trench magazine The Wipers Times.

== See also ==
- List of government and military acronyms
  - List of U.S. government and military acronyms
    - List of United States Marine Corps acronyms and expressions
    - List of U.S. Navy acronyms and expressions
    - List of U.S. Air Force acronyms and expressions
- FUBAR (film), a 2002 mockumentary by Michael Dowse
- Neotrombicula fujigmo § Etymology
- List of aviation mnemonics
- List of aviation, avionics, aerospace and aeronautical abbreviations
- Index of aviation articles
