= Chiga =

Chiga may refer to:

- Chiga people, an ethnic group of Uganda and Rwanda.
- Chiga language (chucnga bunga), their language is spoken by almost 1 million Chigas

== See also ==
- Chigger (disambiguation)
