= Eutrombicula hirsti =

Scientific classification
- Domain: Eukaryota
- Kingdom: Animalia
- Phylum: Arthropoda
- Subphylum: Chelicerata
- Class: Arachnida
- Order: Trombidiformes
- Family: Trombiculidae
- Genus: Eutrombicula
- Species: E. hirsti

Binomial name
- Eutrombicula hirsti (Sambon, 1927)

Synonyms
- Trombicula hirsti Sambon, 1927

Species of mite

Eutrombicula hirsti, commonly called the scrub-itch mite, is a species of mite in the family Trombiculidae. It is found in northern Australia.
