= Trombiculosis =

Mite infestation that involves rash caused by Leptotrombidium deliense

- Other names: Trombiculiasis, or Trombiculidiasis
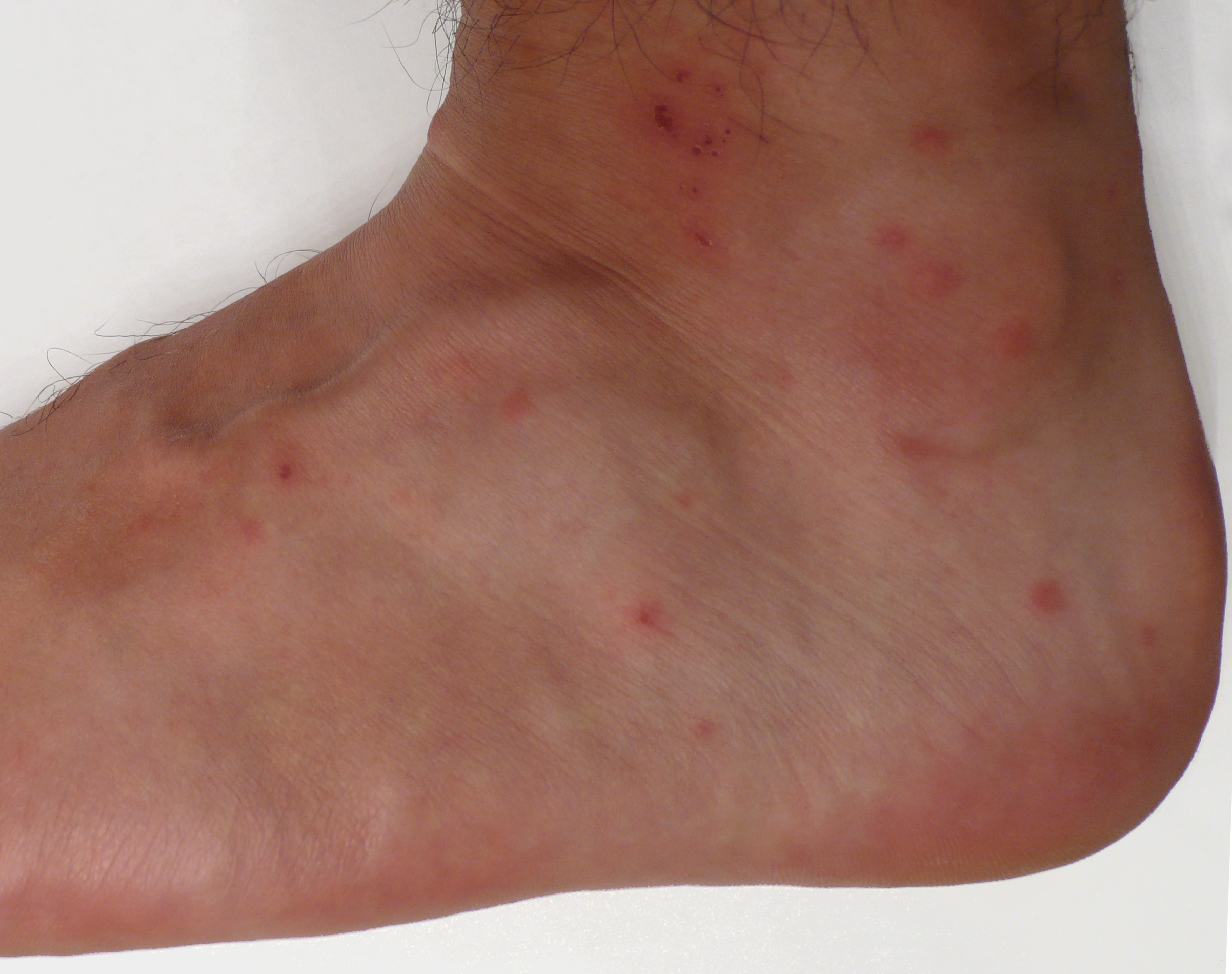
- Chigger bites on the foot and ankle
- Specialty: Dermatology
- Causes: trombiculid mites

Trombiculosis is a rash caused by trombiculid mites, especially those of the genus Trombicula (chiggers). The rash is also often known as chigger bites.

Chiggers are commonly found on the tip of blades of grasses to catch a host, so keeping grass short, and removing brush and wood debris where potential mite hosts may live, can limit their impact on an area. Sunlight that penetrates the grass will make the lawn drier and make it less favorable for chigger survival.

Chiggers seem to affect warm covered areas of the body more than drier areas. Thus, the bites are often clustered behind the knees, or beneath tight undergarments such as socks, underwear, or brassieres. Areas higher in the body (chest, back, waist-band, and under-arms) are affected more easily in small children than in adults, since children are shorter and are more likely than adults to come in contact with low-lying vegetation and dry grass where chiggers thrive. An exceptional case has been described in the eye, producing conjunctivitis.

Application of repellent to the shoes, lower trousers and skin is also useful. Because they are found in grass, staying on trails, roads, or paths can prevent contact. Dusting sulfur is used commercially for mite control and can be used to control chiggers in yards. The dusting of shoes, socks and trouser legs with sulfur can be highly effective in repelling chiggers.

Another good strategy is to recognize the chigger habitat to avoid exposure in the first place. Chiggers in North America thrive late in summer, in dry tall grasses and other thick, unshaded vegetation. Mite repellents and or Acaricide containing one of the following active ingredients are recommended: Permethrin, picaridin, DEET, catnip oil extract (nepetalactone), citronella oil or eucalyptus oil extract.

Chiggers can also be treated using common household vinegar (5% acetic acid).

== Additional images ==
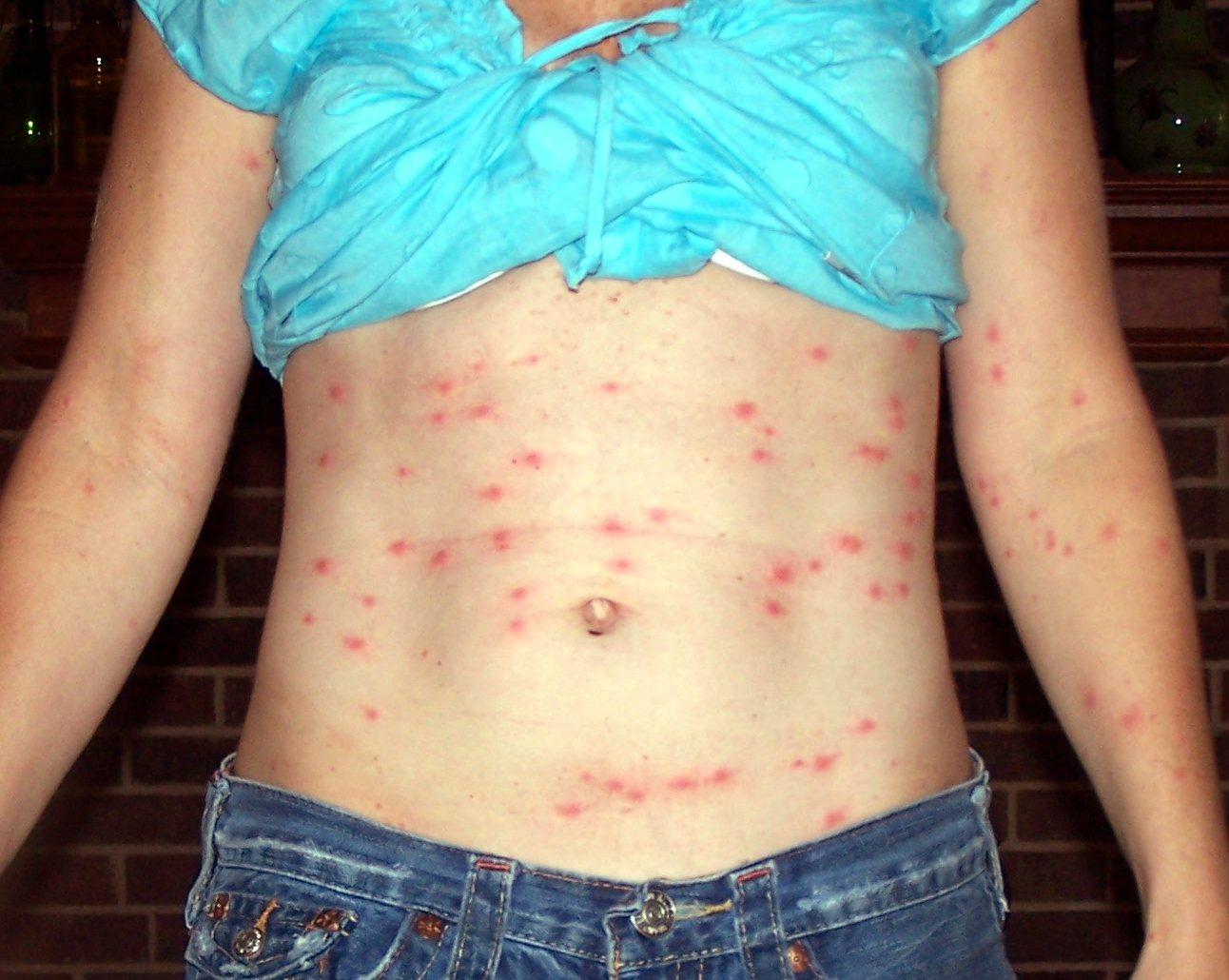
Chigger rash 36 hours after exposure

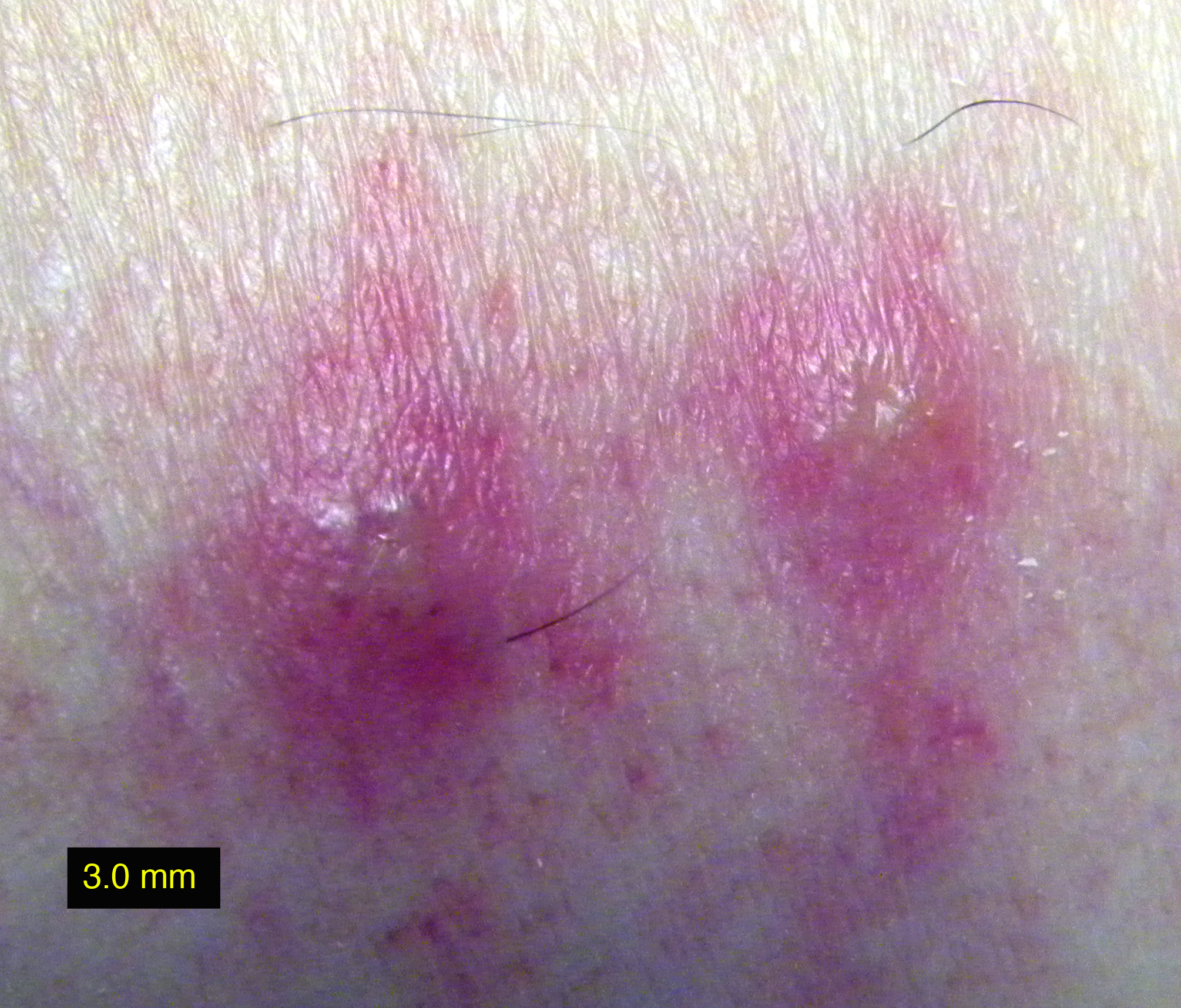
Chigger bites showing characteristic raised and fluid-filled center
