= Trombiculinae =

Scientific classification
- Domain: Eukaryota
- Kingdom: Animalia
- Phylum: Arthropoda
- Subphylum: Chelicerata
- Class: Arachnida
- Order: Trombidiformes
- Family: Trombiculidae
- Subfamily: Trombiculinae; Ewing, 1929

Tribes
- Schoengastiini Vercammen-Grandjean, 1960; Trombiculini Ewing, 1929

Subfamily of mites

Trombiculinae is a subfamily of chiggers belonging to the family Trombiculidae.
