= Acomatacarus =

Scientific classification
- Kingdom: Animalia
- Phylum: Arthropoda
- Subphylum: Chelicerata
- Class: Arachnida
- Order: Trombidiformes
- Family: Trombiculidae
- Genus: Acomatacarus

Genus of mites

Acomatacarus is a genus of mites in the family Trombiculidae. The larvae are parasitic. Species are called also chiggers, scrub itch-mite. The genus includes Acomatacarus arizonensis (lizards), Acomatacarus australiensis (humans, dogs), Acomatacarus galli (chickens, mice, rats, rabbits).

== Characteristics ==
Acomatacarus possess specialized Setae on their legs that are adapted for their parasitic lifestyle. These adaptations include particular features and arrangements in their Gnathosoma, which facilitate attachment and feeding on their hosts.
