= SNAFU =

Military acronym slang

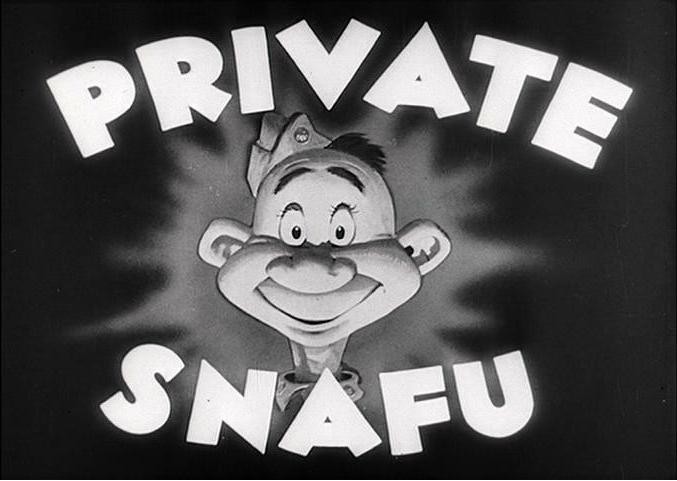
Private Snafu was a series of instructional cartoons devised by Frank Capra and produced by Warner Brothers animators such as Chuck Jones for the US Army during World War II.

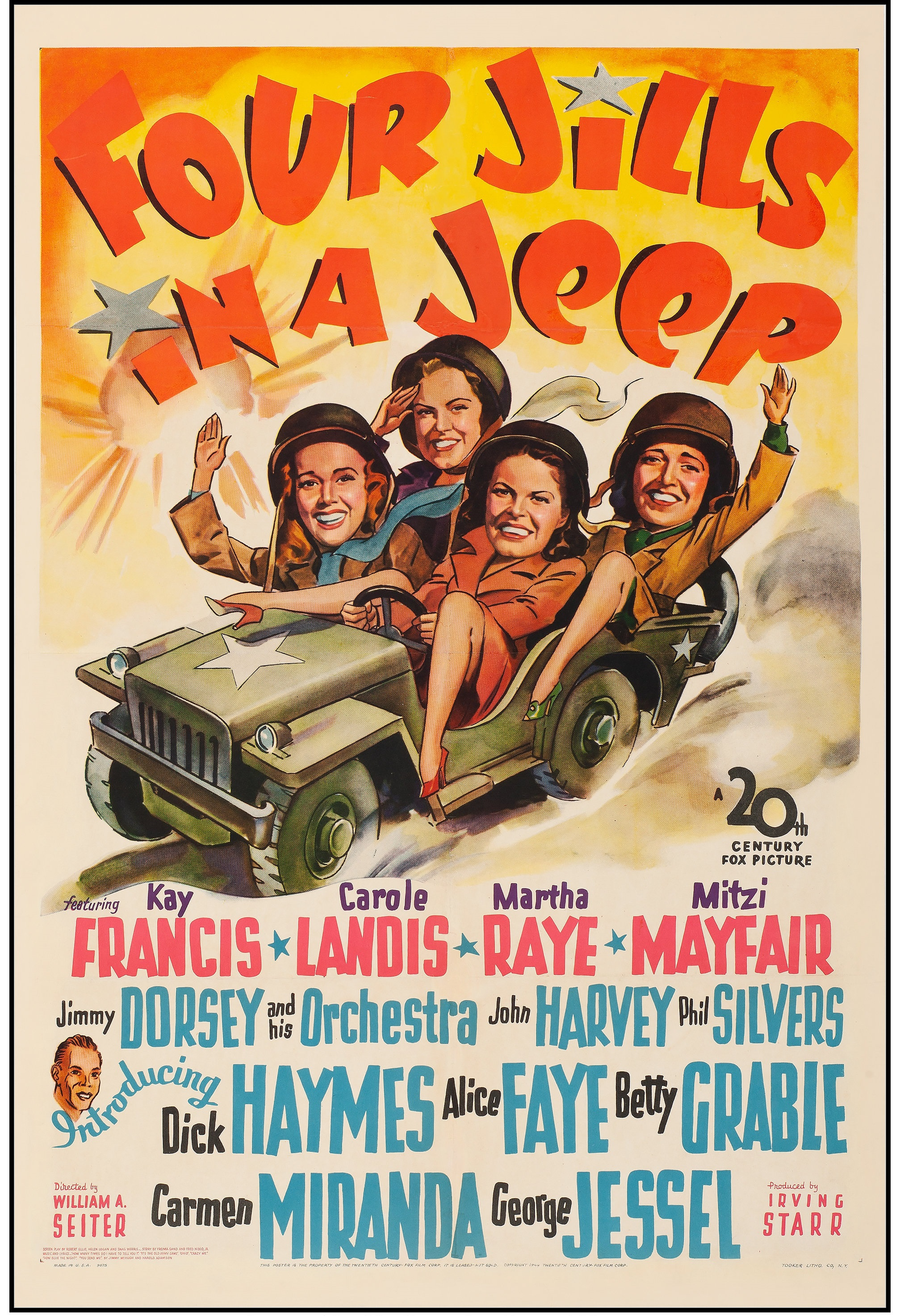
The song "SNAFU, What is the Meaning of SNAFU?" was sung by Mitzi Mayfair, Carole Landis, and Martha Raye for the 1944 film Four Jills in a Jeep. The scene would be cut from the final release of the film, but existed independently and is still available.

SNAFU is an acronym that is widely used to stand for the sarcastic expression "Situation normal: all fucked up". It is an example of military acronym slang. The phrase "all fucked up" is sometimes replaced with "all fouled up" or similar. It means that the situation is bad, but that this is a normal state of affairs. The acronym is believed to have originated in the United States Marine Corps during World War II, particularly as the nickname of USMC Corporal Merriell Shelton.

In modern usage, SNAFU is used to describe running into an error or problem that is large and unexpected. For example, in 2005, The New York Times published an article titled "Hospital Staff Cutback Blamed for Test Result Snafu". SNAFU also sometimes refers to a bad situation, mistake, or cause of trouble, and it is sometimes used as an interjection.

== Origin ==
Most reference works, including the Random House Unabridged Dictionary, supply an origin date of 1940–1944, generally attributing it to the U.S. Army. Rick Atkinson ascribes the origin of SNAFU, FUBAR, and many other terms to cynical GIs ridiculing the army's penchant for acronyms.

The first known publication of the term was by The Kansas City Star, on 27 July 1941. It was subsequently recorded in American Notes and Queries in the September 1941 issue (which the Oxford English Dictionary in 1986 credited as the term's first appearance). Time magazine used the term in its 16 June 1942, issue: "Last week U.S. citizens knew that gasoline rationing and rubber requisitioning were snafu."

The attribution of SNAFU to the American military is not universally accepted: it has also been attributed to the British, although the Oxford English Dictionary gives its origin and first recorded use as U.S. military slang.

In a wider study of military slang, Elkin noted in 1946 that there "are a few acceptable substitutes such as 'screw up' or 'mess up,' but these do not have the emphasis value of the obscene equivalent." He considered the expression to be "a caricature of Army direction. The soldier resignedly accepts his own less responsible position and expresses his cynicism at the inefficiency of Army authority." He also noted that "the expression […] is coming into general civilian use."

== Similar acronyms ==
=== SUSFU ===
Insignia of the U.S. Navy Fighting Squadron 24 and Carrier Air Group 24 with TARFU

SUSFU is an acronym for Situation unchanged: still fucked up, but can also be minced—just like SNAFU—to Situation unchanged: still fouled up. It is used in a military context and was first recorded in the American Notes and Queries (ANQ) in their September 1941 issue.

=== TARFU ===
TARFU is an acronym for Things are really fucked up, minced as Things are really fouled up. It originated during World War Two, possibly in the British Armed Forces, and was first recorded in TIME Magazine in their November 30th, 1942 issue.

== See also ==
- Acronym slang in the military
- List of government and military acronyms

== Sources ==
- Hakim, Joy (1995). A History of Us: War, Peace and all that Jazz. New York: Oxford University Press. ISBN 0-19-509514-6.
- Taylor, Anna Marjorie (1948). The Language of World War II: Abbreviations, Captions, Quotations, Slogans, Titles and Other Terms and Phrases. H.W. Wilson Company.
