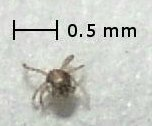
- Larval harvest mite from North America

Scientific classification
- Kingdom: Animalia
- Phylum: Arthropoda
- Subphylum: Chelicerata
- Class: Arachnida
- Order: Trombidiformes
- Family: Trombiculidae
- Genus: Eutrombicula
- Species: E. alfreddugesi

Binomial name
- Eutrombicula alfreddugesi (Oudemans, 1910)

Synonyms
- Trombicula alfreddugesi (Oudemans, 1910)

= Eutrombicula alfreddugesi =

Species of mite

Eutrombicula alfreddugesi is a species in the genus Eutrombicula.

It is the common chigger species of the United States, also sometimes called the harvest mite. Chiggers are the parasitic larval stages of these free-living mites. They are rarely seen in the dry Western states because the species prefers humid climates. They are commonly found in undergrowth and grassy brush areas; the larvae host on animals (e.g. reptiles, birds, and wild and domestic mammals), causing welts that can turn into dermatitis.
