= Guntheria =

Scientific classification
- Domain: Eukaryota
- Kingdom: Animalia
- Phylum: Arthropoda
- Subphylum: Chelicerata
- Class: Arachnida
- Order: Trombidiformes
- Family: Trombiculidae
- Genus: Guntheria; Womersley, 1939

Type species
- Guntheria kallipygos (Gunther, 1939)

Genus of mites

Guntheria is a genus of mites in the family Trombiculidae. The species of this genus are found in Australia and the islands to its north.

The genus was first described by Herbert Womersley in 1939.

== Species ==
The Australian Faunal Directory lists the following as valid:

- Guntheria agnewi (Domrow, 1964)
- Guntheria alpina (Domrow, 1964)
- Guntheria andromeda (Womersley, 1954)
- Guntheria antipodianum (Hirst, 1929)
- Guntheria arguri (Goff, 1979)
- Guntheria bamaga Domrow, 1978
- Guntheria cassiope (Womersley, 1952)
- Guntheria coorongensis (Hirst, 1929)
- Guntheria daniae Domrow, 1971
- Guntheria dasycerci (Hirst, 1929)
- Guntheria derricki (Womersley, 1939)
- Guntheria domrowi (Brennan, 1965)
- Guntheria dumosa (Womersley, 1952)
- Guntheria echymipera (Womersley & Kohls, 1947)
- Guntheria falx Domrow, 1971
- Guntheria heaslipi (Womersley & Heaslip, 1943)
- Guntheria innisfailensis (Womersley & Heaslip, 1943)
- Guntheria insueta Lester, 1984
- Guntheria kallipygos (Gunther, 1939)
- Guntheria kethleyi Goff, 1979
- Guntheria kowanyama Domrow, 1978
- Guntheria lappacea (Womersley, 1952)
- Guntheria mackerrasae (Womersley, 1952)
- Guntheria megale Domrow, 1972
- Guntheria miles Domrow, 1978
- Guntheria napierensis (Goff, 1979)
- Guntheria newmani (Womersley, 1952)
- Guntheria pannosa (Domrow, 1960)
- Guntheria parana (Womersley, 1944)
- Guntheria parva (Womersley, 1954)
- Guntheria perameles (Womersley, 1939)
- Guntheria peregrina (Womersley, 1952)
- Guntheria pertinax Domrow, 1972
- Guntheria petrogale (Womersley, 1934)
- Guntheria petulans (Domrow, 1960)
- Guntheria philippensis (Philip & Woodward, 1946)
- Guntheria platalea Domrow, 1984
- Guntheria pseudomys (Womersley, 1952)
- Guntheria quatuor Domrow, 1972
- Guntheria queenslandica (Womersley, 1939)
- Guntheria raui (Womersley, 1952)
- Guntheria salmleni Domrow, 1984
- Guntheria scaevola (Domrow, 1960)
- Guntheria shareli Domrow, 1984
- Guntheria shieldsi (Gunther, 1941)
- Guntheria smithi (Womersley, 1939)
- Guntheria sphinx Domrow, 1972
- Guntheria taylorae (Domrow, 1962)
- Guntheria tessares Domrow, 1971
- Guntheria tindalei (Womersley, 1936)
- Guntheria translucens (Womersley, 1944)
- Guntheria trichosuri (Womersley, 1939)
- Guntheria vegrandis Domrow, 1974
- Guntheria wongabelensis (Womersley, 1952)
