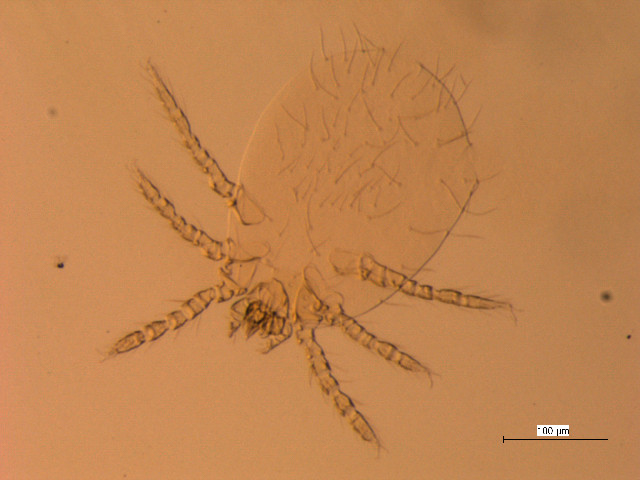
- Neotrombicula microti

Scientific classification
- Domain: Eukaryota
- Kingdom: Animalia
- Phylum: Arthropoda
- Subphylum: Chelicerata
- Class: Arachnida
- Order: Trombidiformes
- Family: Trombiculidae
- Tribe: Trombiculini
- Genus: Neotrombicula; A.S.Hirst, 1925

Synonyms
- Anamasticula Vercammen-Grandjean & Kolebinova, 1985; Arctotrombicula Vercammen-Grandjean & Kolebinova, 1985; Arctrombicula Zoological Record; Digenualaea Vercammen-Grandjean, 1960; Digenualea Zoological Record; Iranotrombicula Stekol'Nikov, 2000; Monogenualata Vercammen-Grandjean, 1960; Neotrombiculoides Vercammen-Grandjean, 1960; Polymasticula Vercammen-Grandjean & Kolebinova, 1985; Vercammenella Feider, 1970

= Neotrombicula =

Genus of mites

Neotrombicula is a genus of mites in the family Trombiculidae. Species of this genus are found throughout Europe and North America.

== Species ==
BioLib includes:

1. Neotrombicula absoluta Schluger, 1966
2. Neotrombicula acomys (Radford, 1957)
3. Neotrombicula aeretes Hsu & Yang, 1985
4. Neotrombicula agriotricha Stekolnikov, 1994
5. Neotrombicula alexandrae Stekolnikov, 1993
6. Neotrombicula anthiana Kolebinova, 1969
7. Neotrombicula arcuata Wen & Jiang, 1984
8. Neotrombicula austriaca Kepka, 1964
9. Neotrombicula autumnalis (Shaw, 1790)
10. Neotrombicula balcanica Kolebinova, 1973
11. Neotrombicula baschkirica Kudryashova, 1998
12. Neotrombicula bisignata (Ewing, 1929)
13. Neotrombicula bondari Kudryashova, 1994
14. Neotrombicula boroveza Vercammen-Grandjean, Kolebinova, Göksu & Kepka, 1971
15. Neotrombicula carpathica Schluger & Vysotzkaja, 1970
16. Neotrombicula centrafricana Goff, 1995
17. Neotrombicula comata Domrow, 1961
18. Neotrombicula corvi Kolebinova, 1971
19. Neotrombicula desaleri (Methlagl, 1927)
20. Neotrombicula digenuala Schluger, 1967
21. Neotrombicula ditricha (Feider, 1955)
22. Neotrombicula earis Kepka, 1964
23. Neotrombicula elegans Schluger, 1966
24. Neotrombicula elegantissima Kolebinova, 1981
25. Neotrombicula faghihi Kudryashova, 1973
26. Neotrombicula fujigmo (Philip & Fuller, 1950)
27. Neotrombicula gemini Domrow, 1971
28. Neotrombicula georgyi Kharadov, 1990
29. Neotrombicula greenlyi Domrow, 1984
30. Neotrombicula inopinata (Oudemans, 1909)
31. Neotrombicula japonica (Tanaka, Kaiwa, Teramura & Kagaya, 1930)
32. Neotrombicula kenyaensis Goff, 1995
33. Neotrombicula kepkai Kolebinova, 1971
34. Neotrombicula marmotae Wen, Zhou, Chen, Wang & Zhang, 1984
35. Neotrombicula microti (Ewing, 1928)
36. Neotrombicula minuta Schluger, 1966
37. Neotrombicula nagayoi (Sasa, Hayashi, Saito, Minura & Asahina, 1950)
38. Neotrombicula naultini (Dumbleton, 1947)
39. Neotrombicula novaehollandiae (Hirst, 1929)
40. Neotrombicula palestinensis (Radford, 1957)
41. Neotrombicula pentagona (Womersley, 1952)
42. Neotrombicula pilosa (Feider, 1948)
43. Neotrombicula pomeranzevi (Schluger, 1948)
44. Neotrombicula pontica Stekolnikov, 2001
45. Neotrombicula rhinolophi Kolebinova, 1968
46. Neotrombicula rhodesiana (Lawrence, 1949)
47. Neotrombicula richmondi (Brennan & Wharton, 1950)
48. Neotrombicula rissa Kudryashova, 1998
49. Neotrombicula sciuricola Kolebinova, 1970
50. Neotrombicula serbovae Kolebinova, 1972
51. Neotrombicula sphenodonti Goff, Loomis & Ainsworth, 1988
52. Neotrombicula subtilis Schluger & Kudryashova, 1969
53. Neotrombicula talmiensis (Schluger, 1955)
54. Neotrombicula thylogale (Womersley, 1954)
55. Neotrombicula tragardhiana (Feider, 1953)
56. Neotrombicula uliginosa Kudryashova, 1998
57. Neotrombicula uraliensis Kudryashova, 1994
58. Neotrombicula vernalis (Willmann, 1942)
59. Neotrombicula villosa Kudryashova, 1994
60. Neotrombicula vulgaris (Schluger, 1955)
