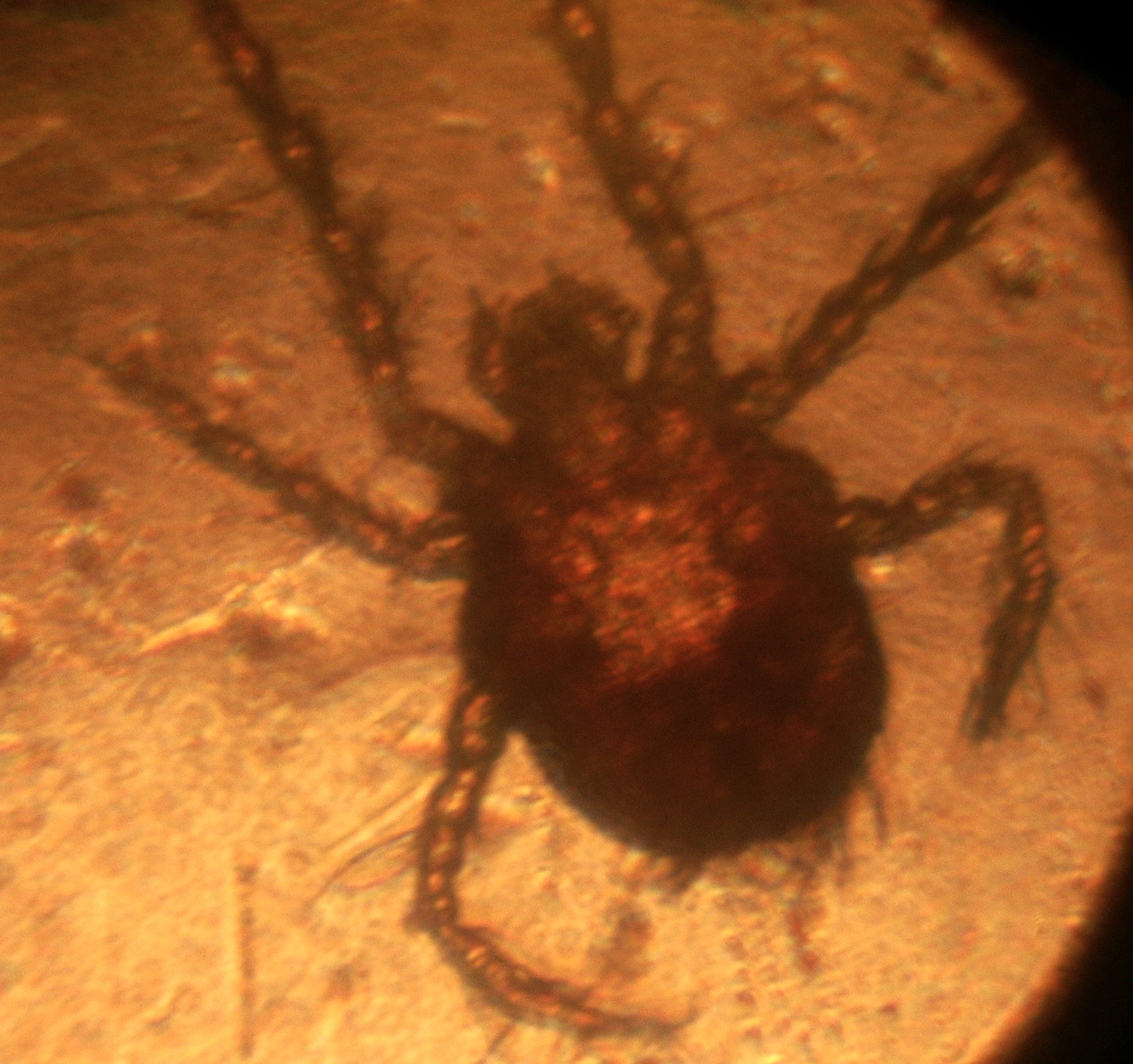

Scientific classification
- Kingdom: Animalia
- Phylum: Arthropoda
- Subphylum: Chelicerata
- Class: Arachnida
- Order: Trombidiformes
- Family: Trombiculidae
- Genus: Neotrombicula
- Species: N. autumnalis

Binomial name
- Neotrombicula autumnalis (Shaw, 1790)

Synonyms
- Acarus autumnalis G.K.Shaw, 1790; Trombicula autumnalis (Shaw)

= Neotrombicula autumnalis =

Species of mite

Neotrombicula autumnalis, known as the harvest mite or autumn chigger, is a species of mite of the family Trombiculidae. Their larvae live parasitically; they infect all domestic mammals, humans, and some ground-nesting birds.

== Description ==
Life cycle

The larvae are normally orange or red with six legs, but develop eight legs by nymph stage. The larvae are up to 0.2 mm (0.01 in) in size, with adult mites about 1 mm (0.04 in) long.

== Habitat and distribution ==
This mite is most frequently found on small rodents and dogs, though mice and moles have also been shown to carry the mite.

== Life cycle ==
The eggs are laid in damp soil. After hatching, the larvae climb blades of grass and wait for a potential host. With their "blade-like chelicerae", they attach themselves to the hosts and feed on their tissues. After sucking, which lasts several days, they fall off and develop over three stages of nymph to adult mites.
