= Larinocerus =

Scientific classification
- Domain: Eukaryota
- Kingdom: Animalia
- Phylum: Arthropoda
- Class: Insecta
- Order: Hemiptera
- Suborder: Heteroptera
- Family: Miridae
- Tribe: Phylini
- Genus: Larinocerus; Froeschner, 1965

Species
- Larinocerus balius Froeschner, 1965; Larinocerus personatus (Knight, 1959)

Synonyms
- Beamerella Knight, 1959

Genus of insects

Larinocerus is a genus of true bugs belonging to the family Miridae.
