= Chig =

Chig may refer to:

- Chig, a member of the fictional species called Chigs in the science fiction series Space: Above and Beyond
- Chig Okonkwo (born 1999), American football player
- Chig Township (འགྲིགས་, 直克乡), Kamba County, Tibet Autonomous Region, China
- Chig Well, the forest (weil) of Chig, former Anglo-Saxon name for Chigwell
- chig, Tasmanian dialect variant for the term Bogan
