= Leptotrombidium deliense =

Scientific classification
- Domain: Eukaryota
- Kingdom: Animalia
- Phylum: Arthropoda
- Subphylum: Chelicerata
- Class: Arachnida
- Order: Trombidiformes
- Family: Trombiculidae
- Genus: Leptotrombidium
- Species: L. deliense

Binomial name
- Leptotrombidium deliense (Walch, 1922)

Species of mite

Leptotrombidium deliense is a species of mite.

It is a vector and reservoir for scrub typhus.

== See also ==
- List of mites associated with cutaneous reactions
