= Stylostome =

Tube structure formed in response to trombiculid mite bites

A diagram of the stylostome, or the hardened tube of dead cells formed by the larval form of the trombiculidae when feeding on them.

The stylostome is a funnel- or channel-like structure formed in response to trombiculid mites. The formation is not caused by the mouthparts of the mites, because these mites do not have needle-like mouthparts as hematophagous animals have been known to have, but have chelicerae, which only pierce the skin. The tube is formed by the digestive enzymes in the saliva, which are the same salivary secretions that break down cells and cause the surrounding tissue to harden. As the mite feeds longer, the saliva seeps further down, digesting more tissue and causing the stylosome to penetrate to lower layers of skin.

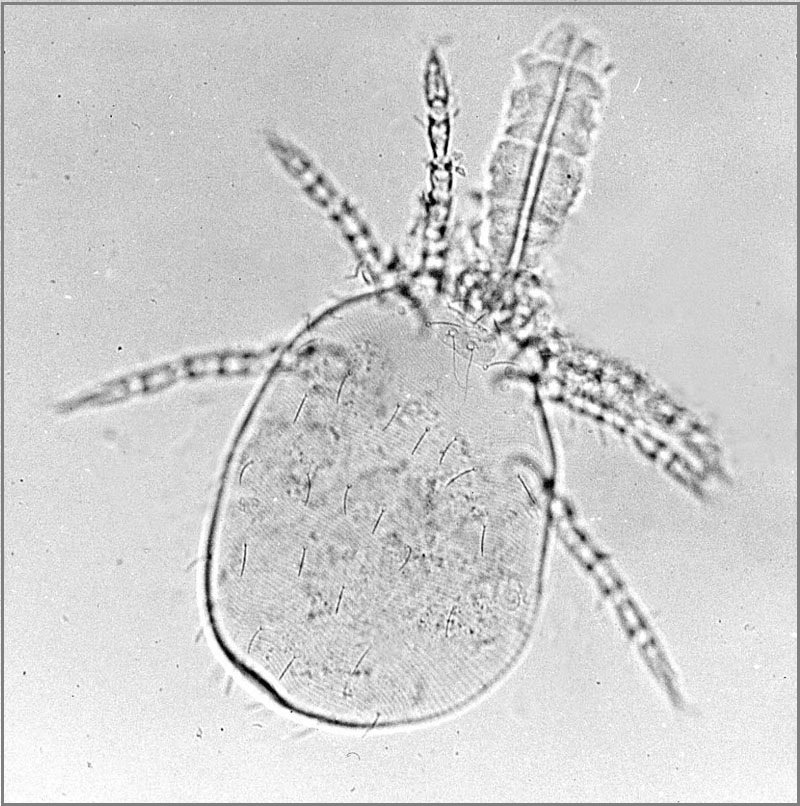
Trombicula mite larva with stylostome

== Transmission of disease ==
Normally, the bite mark causes local swelling or welts, but in more serious cases it causes dermatitis. The mite can be infected with a disease called scrub typhus in Asia and the Pacific and can transmit the disease by carrying saliva directly into the blood stream, but mites in North America have not been known to transmit Lyme disease, Rocky Mountain spotted fever, tularemia or any other disease.
