= Scrub typhus =

Disease caused by O. tsutsugamushi

- Other names: Bush typhus, mite typhus, jungle typhus
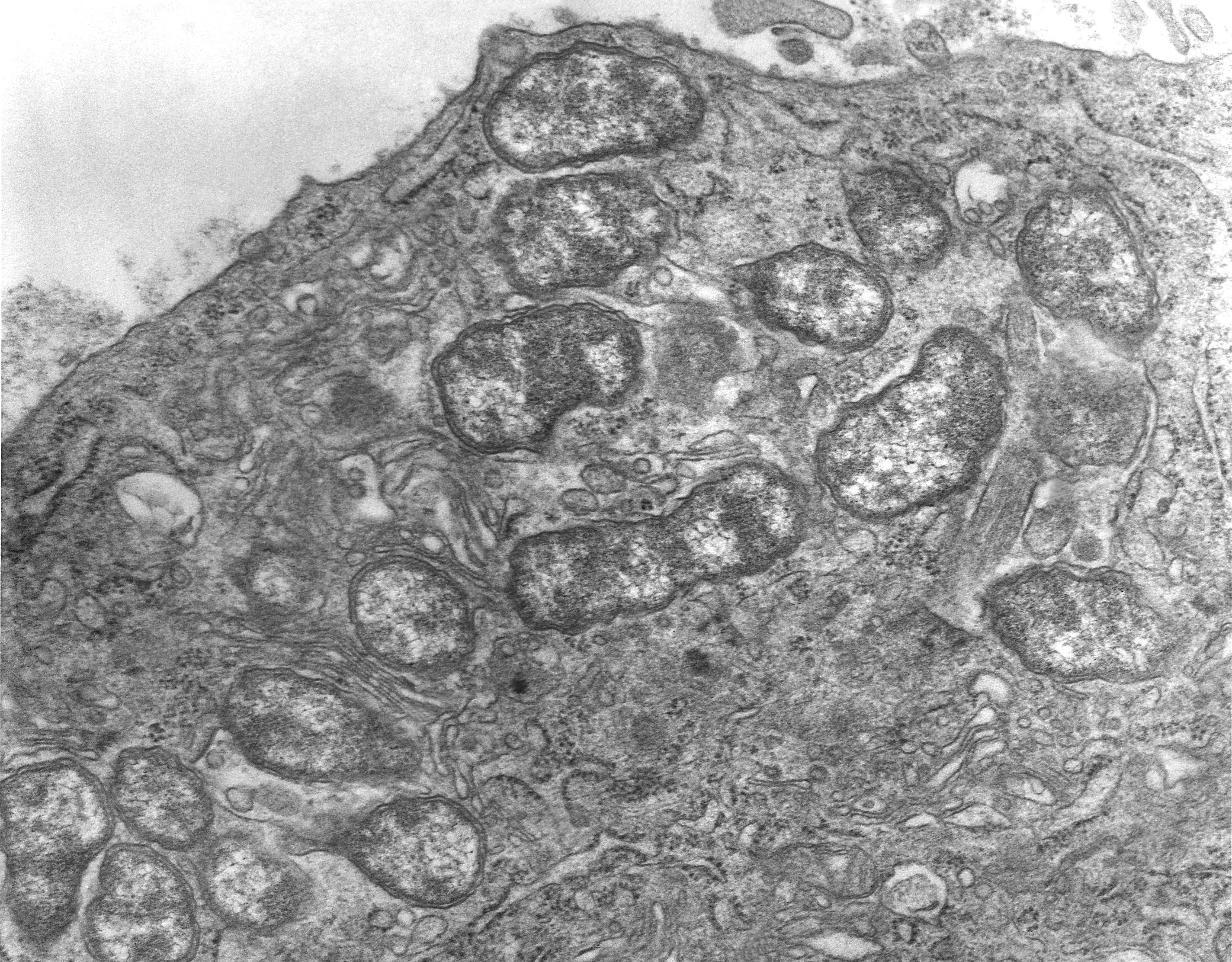
- Orientia tsutsugamushi
- Specialty: Infectious disease

Scrub typhus or bush typhus is a form of typhus caused by the intracellular parasite Orientia tsutsugamushi, a Gram-negative α-proteobacterium of family Rickettsiaceae first isolated and identified in 1930 in Japan.

Although the disease is similar in presentation to other forms of typhus, its pathogen is no longer included in genus Rickettsia with the typhus bacteria proper, but in Orientia. The disease is thus frequently classified separately from the other typhi.

== Signs and symptoms ==
Signs and symptoms include fever, headache, muscle pain, cough, and gastrointestinal symptoms. More virulent strains of O. tsutsugamushi can cause hemorrhaging and intravascular coagulation. Morbilliform rash, eschar, splenomegaly, and lymphadenopathies are typical signs. Leukopenia and abnormal liver function tests are commonly seen in the early phase of the illness. Pneumonitis, encephalitis, and myocarditis occur in the late phase of illness. It has particularly been shown to be the most common cause of acute encephalitis syndrome in Bihar, India.

== Causes ==
Scrub typhus is transmitted by some species of trombiculid mites ("chiggers", particularly Leptotrombidium deliense), which are found in areas of heavy scrub vegetation. The mites feed on infected rodent hosts and subsequently transmit the parasite to other rodents and humans. The bite of this mite leaves a characteristic black eschar that is useful to the doctor for making the diagnosis.

Scrub typhus is endemic to a part of the world known as the tsutsugamushi triangle (after O. tsutsugamushi). This extends from northern Japan and far-eastern Russia in the north, to the territories around the Solomon Sea into northern Australia in the south, and to Pakistan and Afghanistan in the west. It may also be endemic in parts of South America.

The precise incidence of the disease is unknown, as diagnostic facilities are not available in much of its large native range, which spans vast regions of equatorial jungle to the subtropics. In rural Thailand and Laos, murine and scrub typhus account for around a quarter of all adults presenting to hospital with fever and negative blood cultures. The incidence in Japan has fallen over the past few decades, probably due to land development driving decreasing exposure, and many prefectures report fewer than 50 cases per year.

It affects females more than males in Korea, but not in Japan, which may be because sex-differentiated cultural roles have women tending garden plots more often, thus being exposed to vegetation inhabited by chiggers. The incidence is increasing in the southern part of the Indian subcontinent and in northern areas around Darjeeling.

== Diagnosis ==
In endemic areas, diagnosis is generally made on clinical grounds alone. However, overshadowing of the diagnosis is quite often, as the clinical symptoms overlap with other infectious diseases such as dengue fever, paratyphoid, and pyrexia of unknown origin (PUO). If the eschar can be identified, it is quite diagnostic of scrub typhus, but this can be unreliable on dark skin. Moreover, the site of the eschar, which is usually where the mite bites, is often located in covered areas. Unless it is actively searched for, the eschar can easily be missed. The history of a mite bite is often absent since the bite does not inflict pain, and the mites are almost too small to be seen by the naked eye. Usually, scrub typhus is often labelled as PUO in remote endemic areas, since blood culture is often negative, yet it can be treated effectively with chloramphenicol. Where doubt exists, the diagnosis may be confirmed by a laboratory test such as serology. Again, this is often unavailable in most endemic areas, since the serological test involved is not included in the routine screening tests for PUO, especially in Burma (Myanmar).

The choice of laboratory tests is not straightforward, and all currently available tests have their limitations. The cheapest and most easily available serological test is the Weil-Felix test, but this is notoriously unreliable. The best test is indirect immunofluorescence, but the main limitation of this method is the availability of fluorescent microscopes, which are not often available in resource-poor settings where scrub typhus is endemic. Indirect immunoperoxidase, a modification of the standard IFA method, can be used with a light microscope, and the results of these tests are comparable to those from IFA. Rapid bedside kits have been described that produce a result within one hour, but the availability of these tests is severely limited by their cost. Serological methods are most reliable when a four-fold rise in antibody titre is found. If the patient is from a nonendemic area, then diagnosis can be made from a single acute serum sample. In patients from endemic areas, this is not possible because antibodies may be found in up to 18% of healthy individuals.

Other methods include culture and polymerase chain reaction, but these are not routinely available and the results do not always correlate with serological testing, and are affected by prior antibiotic treatment. The currently available diagnostic methods have been summarised.

== Treatment ==
Without treatment, the disease is often fatal; a systematic review estimated a median case fatality of about 6% in untreated patients and about 1.4% in treated patients, although reported rates vary widely between regions.

The drug most commonly used is doxycycline or tetracycline, but chloramphenicol is an alternative. Strains that are resistant to doxycycline and chloramphenicol have been reported in northern Thailand. Rifampicin and azithromycin are alternatives. Azithromycin is an alternative in children and pregnant women with scrub typhus, and when doxycycline resistance is suspected. Ciprofloxacin cannot be used safely in pregnancy and is associated with stillbirths and miscarriage. Combination therapy with doxycycline and rifampicin is not recommended due to possible antagonism.

== Vaccine ==
No licensed vaccines are available.

An early attempt to create a scrub typhus vaccine occurred in the United Kingdom in 1937 (with the Wellcome Foundation infecting around 300,000 cotton rats in a classified project called "Operation Tyburn"), but the vaccine was not used. The first known batch of scrub typhus vaccine actually used to inoculate human subjects was dispatched to India for use by Allied Land Forces, South-East Asia Command in June 1945. By December 1945, 268,000 cc had been dispatched. The vaccine was produced at Wellcome's laboratory at Ely Grange, Frant, Sussex. An attempt to verify the efficacy of the vaccine by using a placebo group for comparison was vetoed by the military commanders, who objected to the experiment.

Enormous antigenic variation in Orientia tsutsugamushi strains is now recognized, and immunity to one strain does not confer immunity to another. Any scrub typhus vaccine should give protection to all the strains present locally, to give an acceptable level of protection. A vaccine developed for one locality may not be protective in another, because of antigenic variation. This complexity continues to hamper efforts to produce a viable vaccine.

Dora Lush, an Australian bacteriologist, died after accidentally pricking her finger with a needle containing scrub typhus while inoculating a mouse in an attempt to develop a vaccine.

== History ==
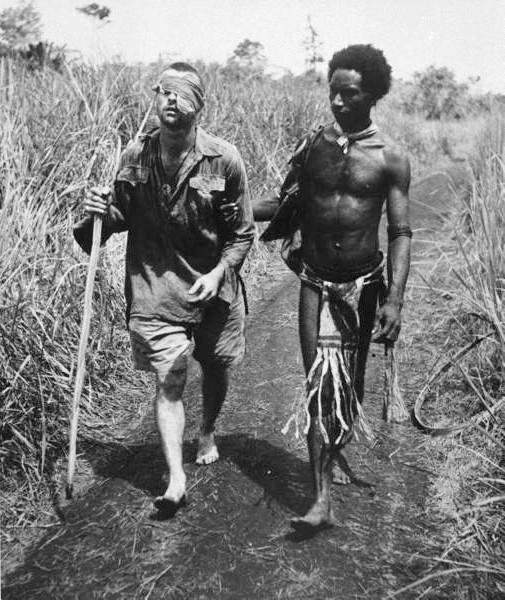
An Australian soldier, Private George "Dick" Whittington, is aided by Papuan orderly Raphael Oimbari, near Buna on 25 December 1942. Whittington died in February 1943 from the effects of bush typhus. (Picture by Life photographer George Silk)

Severe epidemics of the disease occurred among troops in Burma and Ceylon during World War II. Several members of the U.S. Army's 5307th Composite Unit (Merrill's Marauders) died of the disease, as well as many soldiers in the Burma theatre; and before 1944, no effective antibiotics or vaccines were available.

World War II provides some indicators that the disease is endemic to undeveloped areas in all of Oceania in the Pacific theater, although war records frequently lack definitive diagnoses, and many records of "high fever" evacuations were also likely to be other tropical illnesses. In the chapter entitled "The Green War", General MacArthur's biographer William Manchester identifies that the disease was one of several debilitating afflictions affecting both sides on New Guinea in the running bloody Kokoda battles over extremely harsh terrains under intense hardships— fought during a six-month span all along the Kokoda Track in 1942–43, and mentions that to be hospital-evacuated, Allied soldiers (who cycled forces) had to run a fever of 102 °F (39 °C), and that sickness casualties outnumbered weapons-inflicted casualties 5:1. Similarly, the illness was a casualty producer in all the jungle fighting of the land battles of the New Guinea campaign and the Guadalcanal campaign. Where the Allies had bases, they could remove and cut back vegetation, or use DDT as a prophylaxis area barrier treatment, so mite- and tick-induced sickness rates in forces off the front lines were diminished.

The disease was also a problem for US troops stationed in Japan after WWII, and was variously known as "Shichitō fever" (by troops stationed in the Izu Seven Islands) or "Hatsuka fever" (Chiba prefecture).

Scrub typhus was first reported in Chile in 2006. This is likely the result of underdiagnosis and underreporting and not of a recent spread to Chile. In January 2020, the disease was reported in Chile's southernmost region for the first time.

== See also ==
- List of mites associated with cutaneous reactions
