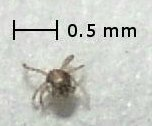
- Larval harvest mite from North America

Scientific classification
- Kingdom: Animalia
- Phylum: Arthropoda
- Subphylum: Chelicerata
- Class: Arachnida
- Order: Trombidiformes
- Family: Trombiculidae
- Tribe: Trombiculini
- Genus: Trombicula; Berlese, 1905

Type species
- Trombicula minor Berlese, 1905

= Trombicula =

Genus of arachnids

Trombicula, known as chiggers, red bugs, harvest mites, scrub-itch mites, or berry bugs, are small arachnids (eight-legged arthropods) in the Trombiculidae family. In their larval stage, they attach to various animals and humans, then feed on skin, often causing itching and trombiculosis. These relatives of ticks are nearly microscopic, measuring 0.4 mm (0.01 in), and have a chrome-orange hue. A common species of harvest mite in North America is Trombicula alfreddugesi.

The larval mites feed on the skin cells, but not blood, of animals. The six-legged parasitic larva feeds on a large variety of creatures, including humans, rabbits, wallabies, toads, box turtles, quail, and even some insects. After crawling onto their hosts, they inject digestive enzymes into the skin that break down skin cells. They do not actually "bite", but instead form a hole in the skin called a stylostome, and chew up tiny parts of the inner skin, thus causing severe irritation and swelling. The severe itching is accompanied by red pimple-like bumps (papules) or hives and skin rash or lesions on a sun-exposed area. For humans, itching usually occurs after the larvae detach from the skin.

After feeding on their hosts, the larvae drop to the ground and become nymphs, then mature into adults, which have eight legs and are harmless to humans. In the postlarval stage, they are not parasitic and feed on plant materials. The females lay three to eight eggs in a clutch, usually on a leaf or under the roots of a plant, and die by autumn.

== Distribution ==
Species in the genus Trombicula are found throughout the world. In Europe and North America, they tend to dwell in hot and humid climates. In more temperate regions, they are found only in summer. In France, for example, they are called aoûtat, after août (August), vendangeon, after vendange (harvest), or rouget, after rouge (red).

In the United States, trombicula are found mostly in the southeast, the south, and the Midwest. They are rarely found in far northern areas, high mountains or deserts, however they can be found in the Great Lakes region. They live in low, damp areas within forests and grasslands, as well as in drier environments where vegetation is low-growing but profuse, such as lawns, golf courses and parks. They are most numerous in early summer when grass, weeds and other vegetation are most prevalent. Harvest mites can also find their way into homes via human hosts who have passed through such areas.

== Taxonomy ==
Species include:

- Trombicula agurensis (Goff & Easton, 1989)
- Trombicula alfreddugesi
- Trombicula asiatica (Wen & Corpuz-Raros, 1997)
- Trombicula blumbergi Asanuma, 1959
- Trombicula canestrinii (Buffa, 1899)
- Trombicula chejudoensis (Goff, 1984)
- Trombicula chiroptera Womersley & Heaslip, 1943
- Trombicula dasyphloea Domrow, 1959
- Trombicula dewae Domrow, 1964
- Trombicula dimolinae Audy, 1952
- Trombicula elegans Womersley, 1942
- Trombicula geckobia (Womersley, 1952)
- Trombicula hexasternalaea (Brown, 1997)
- Trombicula knighti Radford, 1954
- Trombicula koomori Sasa & Jameson, 1954
- Trombicula leegoffi (Brown, 1997)
- Trombicula leytensis (Brown, Goff & Nadchatram, 1988)
- Trombicula longwuensis Zhao & Wen, 1984
- Trombicula lukoschusi (Goff, 1983)
- Trombicula manjuyodensis (Brown, 1997)
- Trombicula meilingensis (Zhao, 1984)
- Trombicula minor Berlese, 1905
- Trombicula mitchellensis (Goff, 1983)
- Trombicula naultini Dumbleton, 1947
- Trombicula papua Domrow, 1978
- Trombicula patrizii Valle, 1952
- Trombicula pectinigera Lombardini, 1962
- Trombicula pyriformis (Wang & Song, 1990)
- Trombicula quadriensis Womersley & Heaslip, 1943
- Trombicula reticulata Vercammen-Grandjean & Nadchatram, 1963
- Trombicula rugosa (Goff, 1979)
- Trombicula signata Womersley, 1934
- Trombicula sinensis (Zhao & Qiu, 1979)
- Trombicula southcotti Womersley, 1952
- Trombicula spinosa Lombardini, 1952
- Trombicula thomasi (Oudemans)
- Trombicula thomsoni Womersley, 1954
- Trombicula tibbi Vercammen-Grandjean, 1965
- Trombicula tienmushanensis (Chu, 1964)
- Trombicula tsaochiensis (Chen & Hsu, 1963)
- Trombicula tuberculata Fauran, 1959
- Trombicula umboiensis (Goff, 1982)
- Trombicula victoriensis Audy & Womersley, 1957
- Trombicula vorca Traub & Audy, 1954
- Trombicula wenquana (Wen & Xiang, 1984)

== See also ==
- Chigger bite
- Human parasite
- List of human parasites
