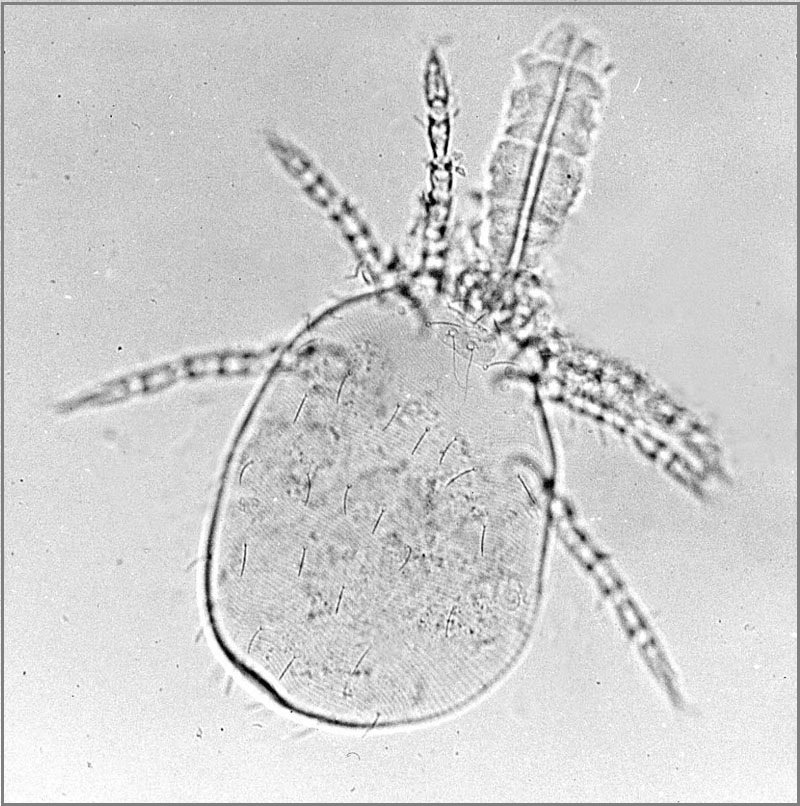
- Trombiculid mite larva

Scientific classification
- Kingdom: Animalia
- Phylum: Arthropoda
- Subphylum: Chelicerata
- Class: Arachnida
- Order: Trombidiformes
- Suborder: Prostigmata
- Infraorder: Anystina
- Superfamily: Trombidioidea
- Family: Trombiculidae; Ewing, 1929

Type genus
- Trombicula Berlese, 1919

Genera
- Acomatacarus; Afropolonia; Anahuacia; Ascoschoengastia; Axiogastia; Blankaartia; Brunehaldia; Chatia; Cheladonta; Doloisia; Euschoengastia; Eutrombicula; Gahrliepia; Guntherana; Guntheria; Hannemania; Heaslipia; Hirsutiella; Kayella; Leptotrombidium; Microtrombicula; Miyatrombicula; Neoschoengastia; Neotrombicula; Novotrombicula; Ornithogastia; Parasecia; Pseudoschoengastia; Schoengastiella; Schoutedenichia; Speleocola; Trombicula; Whartonia
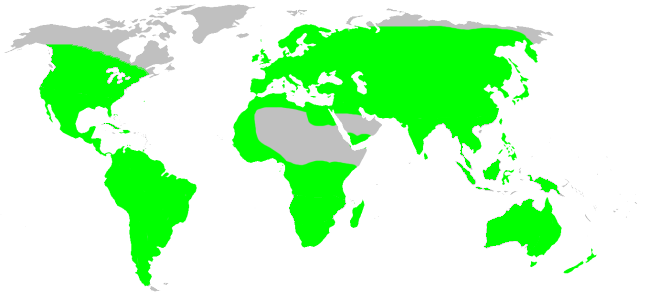
- The distribution of trombiculid species, which is nearly everywhere in the world

= Trombiculidae =

Family of trombidiform mites

Trombiculidae (/trɒmbɪˈkjuːlɪdiː/), commonly referred to in North America as chiggers and in Britain as harvest mites, and also known as berry bugs, bush-mites, red bugs or scrub-itch mites, are a family of mites. Chiggers are often confused with jiggers, a type of flea. In their larval stage several species of Trombiculidae bite animal hosts to feed on their skin. To do so they embed their mouthparts into the skin, causing irritation. Humans can be hosts.

Trombiculidae live in forests and grasslands and are often found in the vegetation of low, damp areas such as berry bushes, orchards, along lakes and streams, as well as drier places where vegetation is low, such as lawns, golf courses, and parks. They are most numerous in early summer when grass, weeds, and other vegetation is heaviest. They are relatives of ticks and are nearly microscopic, measuring 400 μm (1/60 of an inch) and have a chrome-orange hue. There is a constriction in the front part of the body in the nymph and adult stages. The best known species of chigger in North America is the hard-biting Trombicula alfreddugesi of the Southeastern United States, humid Midwest and Mexico. In the UK, the most prevalent harvest mite is Neotrombicula autumnalis, which is distributed through Western Europe to Eastern Asia.

Trombiculid mites go through a lifecycle of egg, larva, nymph, and adult. The six-legged parasitic larvae feed on a large variety of animals, including humans, rabbits, toads, box turtles, quail, and even some insects. In the larval stage they crawl onto their hosts and inject digestive enzymes into the skin that break down skin cells. They do not actually bite, but instead form a hole in the skin, called a stylostome, and digest parts of the inner skin, causing irritation and swelling. The itching is accompanied by red papules (pimple like bumps) or hives, dermititis, and skin rash or lesions on a sun-exposed area. For humans, itching usually occurs after the larvae detach from the skin.

After feeding on their hosts, the larvae drop to the ground and become nymphs, then mature into adults, which have eight legs and are harmless to humans. In the post-larval stages, they are not parasitic and feed on plant material and insects. The females lay three to eight eggs in a clutch, usually on a leaf or among the roots of a plant, and die by autumn.

== History ==
Trombiculidae, from Greek τρομειν ("to tremble") and Latin culex, genitive culicis ("gnat" or "midge"), was first described as an independent family by Henry Ellsworth Ewing in 1944. Initially it included two subfamilies, Hemitrombiculinae and Trombiculinae. Womersley added another, Leeuwenhoekiinae, which at the time contained only Leeuwenhoekia. Later, he erected the family Leeuwenhoekiidae for the genus and subfamily, having six genera; they have a pair of submedian setae present on the dorsal plate.

References to chiggers, however, go as far back as sixth-century China, and by 1733, the first recognition of trombiculid mites in North America was made. In 1758, Carl Linnaeus described a single species, Acarus batatas (now Trombicula batatas). However, most information about chiggers came from problems that arose during and after World War II.

== Distribution ==
Trombiculid mites are found throughout the world. In Europe and North America, they tend to be more prevalent in the hot and humid regions. In northern Europe, including the British Isles where they are called harvest mites, the species Neotrombicula autumnalis are found during the summer and autumn, and in French harvest mites are called aoûtat because they are common in August. In the United States, they are found mostly in the South and the Midwest. They are not present, or are scarce, in far northern areas, high mountains, and deserts. In North America, the species Trombicula alfreddugesi is the most common, while the species Trombicula (eutrombicula) hirsti is found in Australia, where it is commonly called the scrub-itch mite.

== Life cycle ==
The life cycle of a harvest mite

The length of the mite's cycle depends on species and environment, but normally lasts two to twelve months. The number of cycles in a year depends on the region. For example, in a temperate region, only three per year may occur, but in tropical regions, the cycle can be continuous throughout the year. Adult harvest mites winter in protected places, such as slightly below the soil surface. In temperate regions, females become active in the spring, and once the ground temperature is regularly above 16 °C (60 °F), they lay eggs in vegetation, up to 15 eggs per day. The eggs are round and are dormant for about six days, after which the non-feeding prelarvae emerge, with only three pairs of legs. After about six days, the prelarvae grow into their larval stage.

=== Larva ===
The larvae, commonly called chiggers, are about 170–210 μm (0.007–0.008 in) in diameter, normally light red in color, and covered in hairs; they move quickly relative to size. The larvae congregate in groups on small clods of soil, in matted vegetation, and even on low bushes and plants, where they have more access to prospective hosts. The larval stage is the only parasitic stage of the mite's lifecycle. They are parasites to many animals. This often causes intensely itchy, red bumps in humans.

A diagram of the stylostome, or the hardened tube of dead cells formed by the larval form of the Trombiculidae when feeding

Chiggers attach to the host, pierce the skin, inject enzymes into the wound that digest cellular contents, and then suck up the digested tissue through a tube formed by hardened skin cells called a stylostome. They do not burrow into the skin or suck blood, as is commonly assumed. Itching from a chigger bite may not develop until 24–48 hours after the bite, so the victim may not associate the specific exposure with the bite itself. The red welt/bump on the skin is not where a chigger laid eggs, as is sometimes believed. The larvae remain attached to suitable hosts for three to five days before dropping off to begin their nymphal stage. They tend to attach where clothing has restrictions, such as belt lines, or behind the knees when wearing jeans.

During the wet season, chiggers are usually found in tall grass and other vegetation. During dry seasons, chiggers are mostly found underneath brush and shady areas. Standing still or lying in tall grass gives them more time to climb onto a person.

=== Nymph ===
Once the larva has gorged itself on skin and has fallen off its host, it develops to its nymph stage. The nymph is sexually immature, but more closely resembles the adult.

This stage consists of three phases: the protonymph, deutonymph, and tritonymph. The protonymph and tritonymph morphologies are unusual in species of Trombiculidae. The protonymph phase combines larval and protonymph characteristics with deutonymph and tritonymph morphology. The protonymph is an inactive transitional stage. The active deutonymph develops an additional pair of legs (for a total of eight). Finally, it re-enters inactivity during its transitional tritonymph phase before growing to adulthood.

=== Adult ===
As deutonymphs and adults, trombiculid mites are independent predators that feed on small arthropods and their eggs, and are also found to eat plant material. They live in soil and are often found when digging in yards or gardens or in compost bins.

In 2018, methods based on autofluorescence microscopy were developed to enable identification of trombiculid mites to the species level on the basis of morphological traits without any special preparation.

== Effect on humans ==
=== Trombiculosis ===
Trombiculosis, also called trombiculiasis and trombiculidiasis, is the term coined for the rash or infestation caused by trombiculid mite larvae.

=== Treatment ===
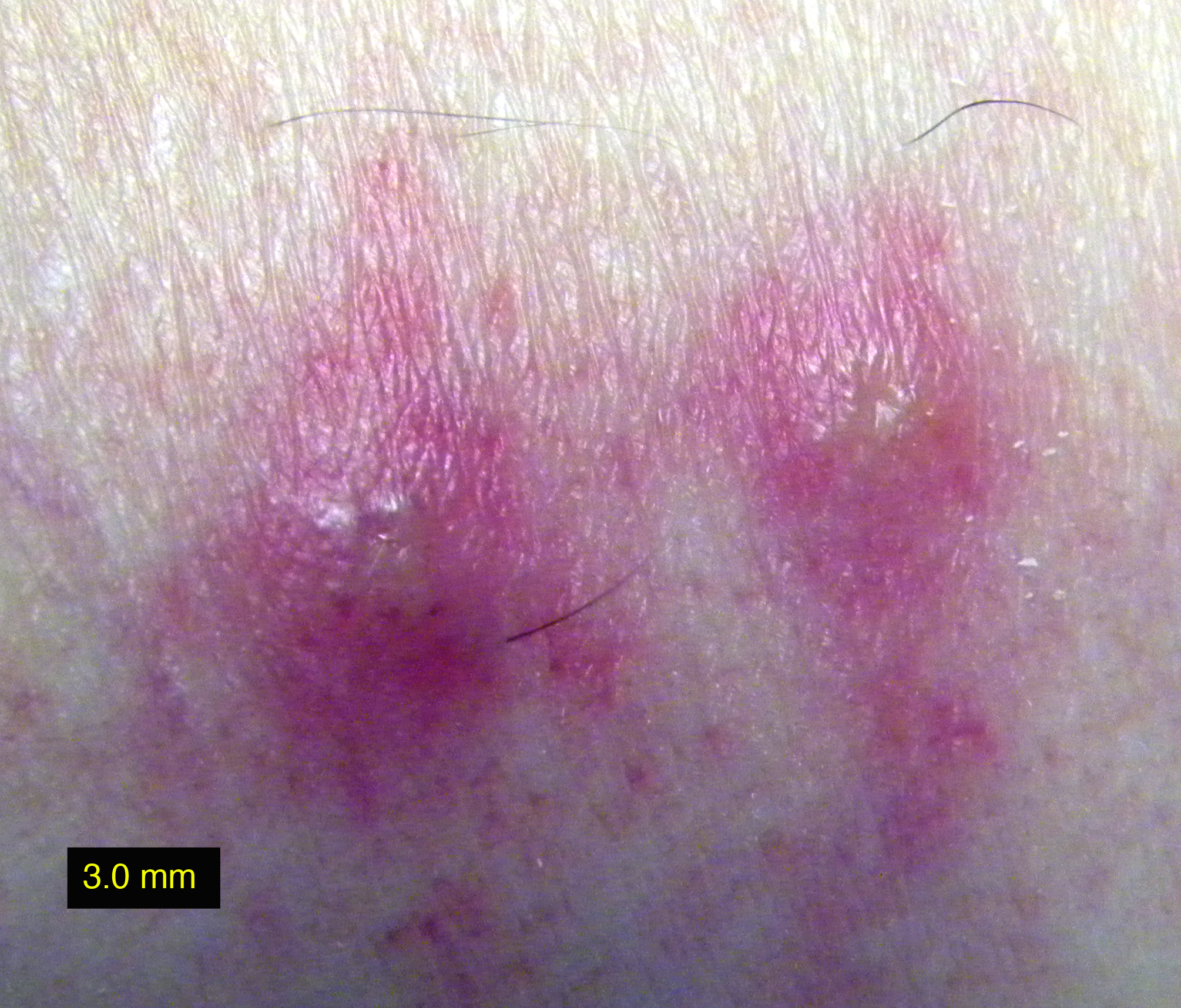
Chigger-caused lesions on human skin showing characteristic welts

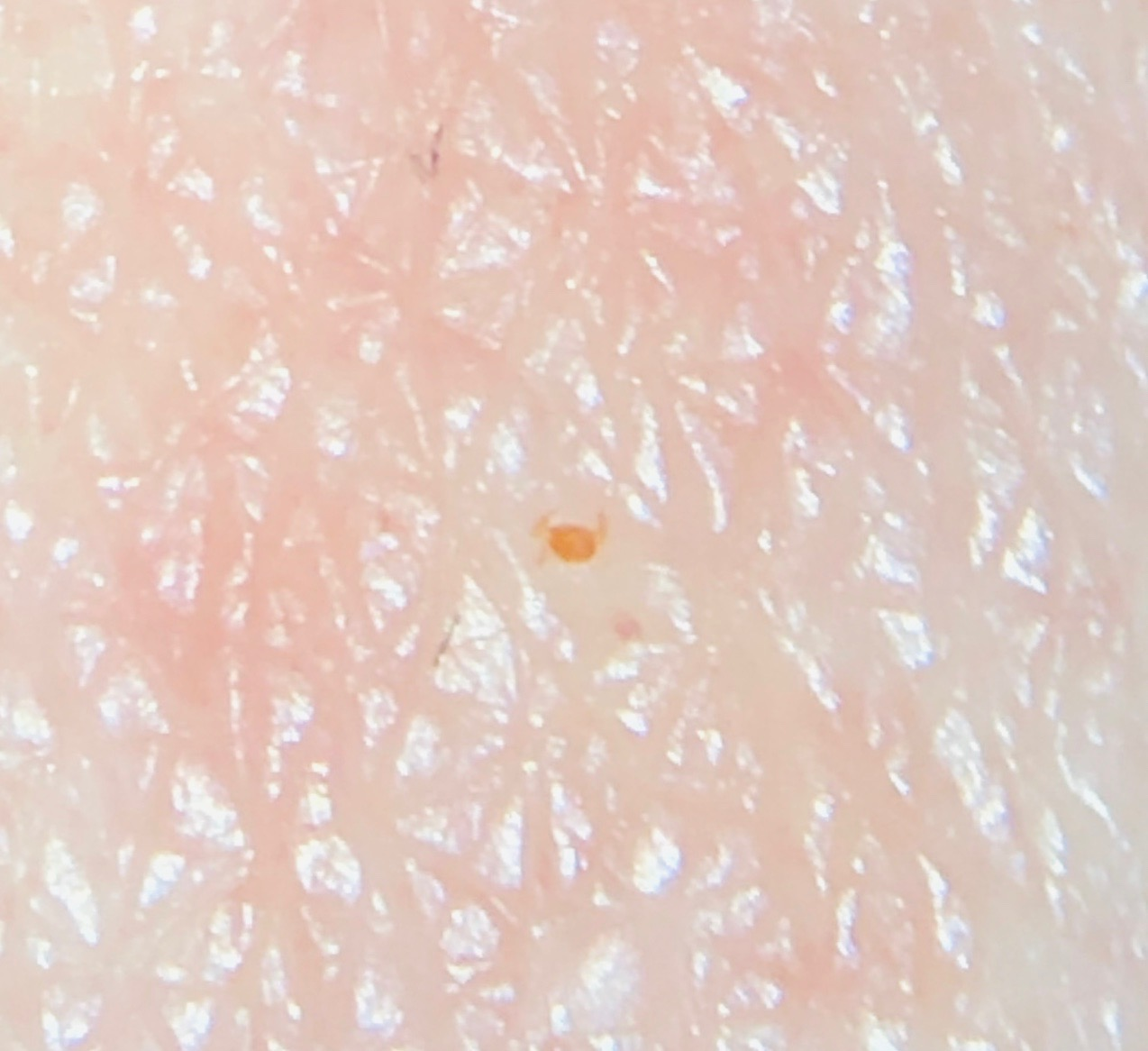
A trombiculid mite larva attached to human skin

Chigger wounds are a complex combination of enzymatic and mechanical damage, allergy and immune responses, and possible secondary bacterial infection. Due to this complexity, there is not a remedy that works well for everyone.

The chiggers' digestive enzymes in the saliva cause "the intensely itchy welts". The itching can be alleviated through use of over-the-counter topical corticosteroids and antihistamines. According to Mayo Clinic, the red, itchy welts normally heal on their own within one to two weeks. Hot showers or baths also help reduce itching. In cases of severe dermatitis or secondary infection associated with chigger bites, a doctor should be consulted.

According to an Ohio State University Extension Fact Sheet:

... After returning from a chigger-infested area, launder the field clothes in soapy, hot water (50 °C (125 °F).) ... As soon as possible, take a good hot bath or shower and soap repeatedly. The chiggers may be dislodged, but you will still have the stylostomes, causing the severe itch. Scratching deep to remove stylostomes can cause secondary infections. For temporary relief of itching, apply ointments of benzocaine, hydrocortisone, calamine lotion, New Skin, After Bite, or others recommended by your pharmacist or medical doctor. ... (The sooner the treatment, the better the results.)

Home remedies to "suffocate" the mite, such as applying clear nail polish, rubbing alcohol, or bleach, may have little benefit since the mites do not burrow into the skin, and fall off after feeding. However, since the mite may still be attached for up to three days, these treatments could possibly kill the mite, reducing further damage.

=== Chiggers as disease vectors ===
Although the harvest mite chigger usually does not carry diseases in North American temperate climates, Leptotrombidium deliense is considered a dangerous pest in East Asia and the South Pacific because it often carries Orientia tsutsugamushi, the bacterium that causes scrub typhus, which is known alternatively as the Japanese river disease, scrub disease, or tsutsugamushi. The mites are infected by bacteria passed down from parent to offspring in a process called transovarial transmission. Symptoms of scrub typhus in humans include fever, headache, muscle pain, cough, and gastrointestinal symptoms. Without treatment, the disease can be fatal.
