= Henrique da Rocha Lima =

Brazilian physician (1879–1956)

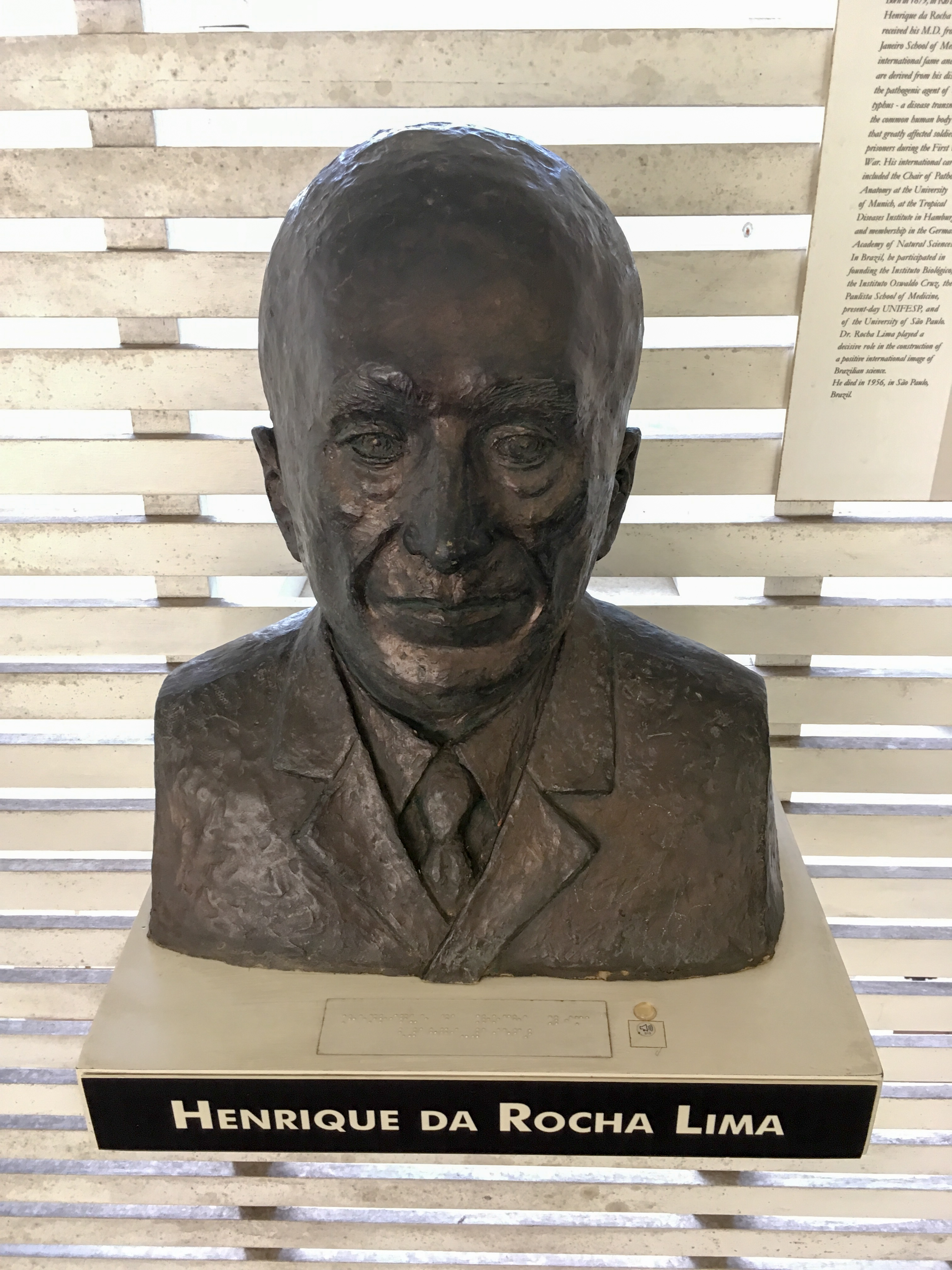
Bust at Instituto Butantan.

Henrique da Rocha Lima (24 November 1879 – 12 April 1956) was a Brazilian physician, pathologist and infectologist born in Rio de Janeiro. With his friend, Stanislaus von Prowazek, he described what would later be known as Rickettsia prowazekii, the pathogen of epidemic typhus. Rocha Lima named the organism after Prowazek and American bacteriologist Howard Taylor Ricketts (1871-1910).

Henrique da Rocha Lima received his M.D. degree from the Medical School of Rio de Janeiro in 1905. He was one of the founders of the Oswaldo Cruz Institute, where he worked as a professor of pathology with other famous Brazilian researchers, such as Oswaldo Cruz himself, Adolfo Lutz and Carlos Chagas (the discoverer of Chagas disease) in the areas of microbiology, immunology and infectious diseases. Rocha Lima developed an international career in medical research, working with pathologist Hermann Dürck (1869-1941) at the Ludwig-Maximilians-Universität München, and from 1909, as director of the department of pathology at the Institute for Maritime and Tropical Diseases in Hamburg.

In Brazil, he was a scientific and educational leader, as he participated in the foundation of the Paulista School of Medicine, and of the University of São Paulo. Rocha Lima was also a president of the Brazilian Society for the Advancement of Science. He received several awards and distinctions, such as the Iron Cross of the German Empire, the Benemerence Medal by Pope Pius XI, the Nocht Medal for distinguished researchers on Tropical Diseases, and the effective membership of the German Academy of Natural Sciences. His name has been given to the Student Union (Centro Acadêmico) at the Faculty of Medicine of Ribeirão Preto, in Ribeirão Preto, Brazil.

In 2007, a new strain of Gram-negative bacteria was named after Rocha Lima, Bartonella rochalimae.

== Partial list of writings ==
- Zur Aetiologie des Fleckfiebers. Berliner klinische Wochenschrift, 1916, 53: 567–569.
- Rickettsien. Handbuch der pathologischen Mikroorganismen. 3, Abteilung, Band 8, 2. Jena, Berlin and Vienna, 1930.
- Rickettsia prowazeki- sua descoberta e caracterização constituindo um novo grupo de microrganismos. Revista Brasileira de Medicina, 1951, 8 (5): 311–320.

== Bibliography ==
- Falcão, E.C. A Vida Científica de Henrique da Rocha Lima. Rev Bras Malariol Doencas Trop. 1967 Apr-Jun;19(2):353-8. (Article in Portuguese)
- Falcão, E.C. Henrique Rocha Lima e a Descoberta da Rickettsia prowazekii. Rev Inst Med Trop São Paulo. 1966 Mar-Apr;8(2):55-9. (Article in Portuguese)
