= Dürck =

Dürck is a surname. Notable people with the surname include:

- Friedrich Dürck (1809–1884), Saxon painter
- Hermann Dürck (1869–1941), German pathologist and histologist
