= Hans Zinsser =

American physician, bacteriologist and author (1878–1940)

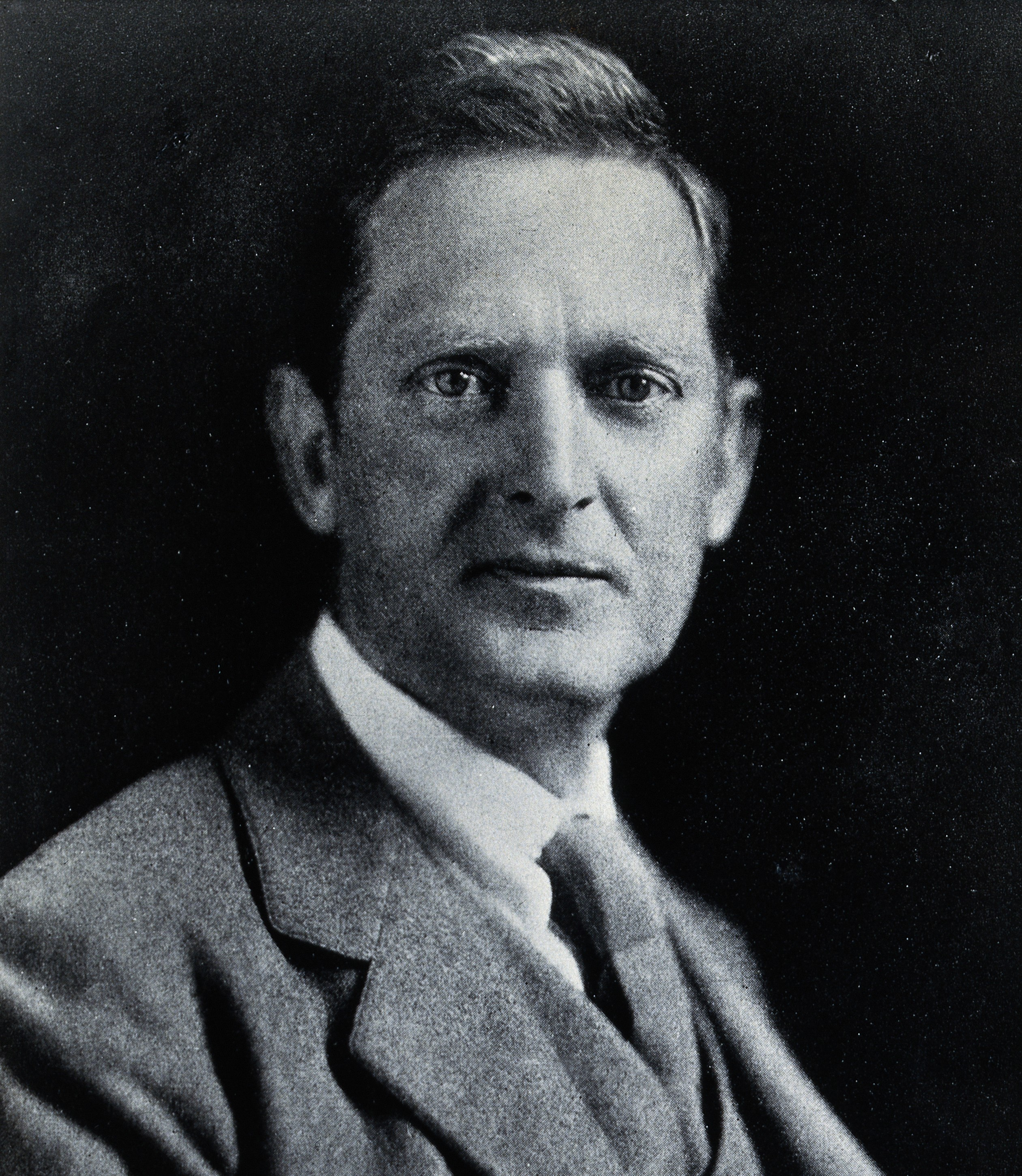
- Born: November 17, 1878; New York City
- Died: September 4, 1940 (age 61); New York City
- Education: Timothy Dwight School
- Alma mater: Columbia University (A.B., M.A., and M.D.)
- Known for: Typhus research Rats, Lice and History
- Scientific career
- Fields: Physician, bacteriologist, epidemiologist
- Workplaces: Columbia University; Stanford University; Harvard Medical School
- Doctoral advisor: Philip Hanson Hiss
- Doctoral students: William Hammon; Rebecca Lancefield

Hans Zinsser (November 17, 1878 – September 4, 1940) was an American physician, bacteriologist, and author of over 200 medical articles and books. He spent many years researching typhus and developing a vaccine. As an author, his best-known book was the 1935 chronicle of epidemic typhus titled Rats, Lice and History. His 1940 memoir, As I Remember Him, was one of the first National Book Award recipients.

== Biography ==
=== Early life ===
The son of German immigrants, Zinsser was born in New York City in 1878. He attended Timothy Dwight School on the Upper West Side of Manhattan. He obtained an A.B. from Columbia University in 1899, and continued on at Columbia to earn M.A. and M.D. degrees in 1903.

In June 1905, he married Ruby Handforth Kunz (eldest daughter of mineralogist George Frederick Kunz), and they had two children.

=== Career ===
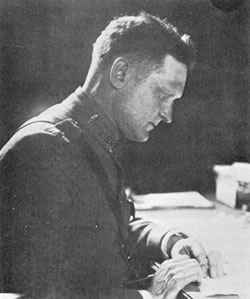
Zinsser as a US Army Medical Corps officer in World War I

After interning at New York City's Roosevelt Hospital from 1903 to 1905, Zinsser was a practicing physician for a few years. However, he was more interested in the research and teaching side of medicine, and in 1908 accepted a position as Instructor in Bacteriology at Columbia. In 1910 he was hired by Stanford University to start a new bacteriology department. His initial title was associate professor; the following year he was promoted to full professor. In 1913 he returned to Columbia as Professor of Bacteriology and Immunology. Some of the doctoral students he advised went on to distinguished careers, among them Rebecca Lancefield, although he did not permit her to work in his laboratory due to her gender. In 1923 he moved to Harvard Medical School where he was a professor and researcher until his death.

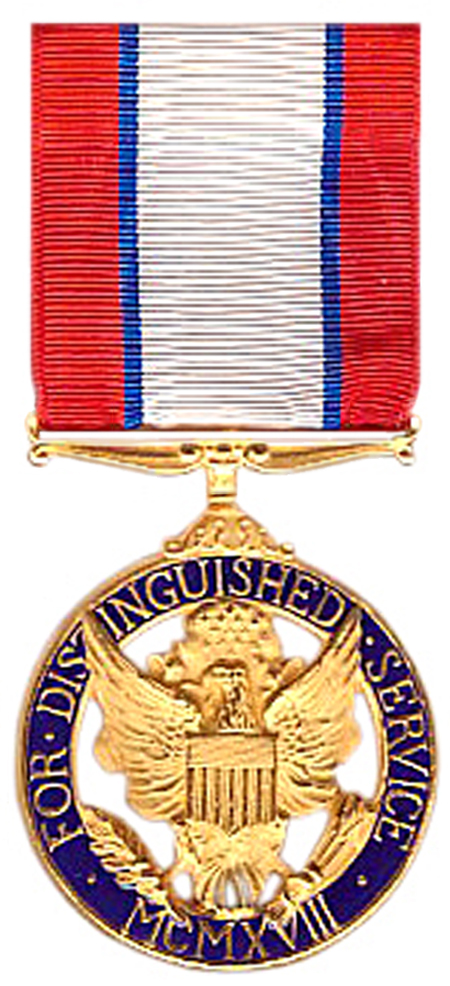
US Army Distinguished Service Medal

During World War I, Zinsser went to Serbia in 1915 as a member of the American Red Cross Sanitary Commission. He later served in France in the US Army Medical Corps and was promoted to lieutenant colonel. He was awarded the Distinguished Service Medal, the citation for which read: "While acting as sanitary inspector of the 2nd Army, he organized, perfected and administered with extraordinary and exceptional success a plan of military sanitation and epidemic disease control." He also received a military citation for taking exceptional risks to minister to wounded soldiers while under enemy fire. He was awarded the Order of St. Sava of Serbia and the Legion of Honour in France.

After the war, Zinsser held a one-year term as president of the American Association of Immunologists. He was elected to the American Academy of Arts and Sciences in 1923, the U.S. National Academy of Sciences in 1924, and the American Philosophical Society in 1937.

In his scientific research, Zinsser spent many years studying typhus, including the condition that came to be known as Brill–Zinsser disease. He isolated the typhus bacterium and developed vaccines for different strains of the disease.

He wrote several books about biology and bacteria, most notably Rats, Lice and History (1935), a "biography" of typhus fever that combined his scientific knowledge of typhus with his wide reading in history and literature. He was also a published poet whose verses appeared in The Atlantic Monthly.

Zinsser mentored other scientists such as Albert Coons, who helped devise the technique of immunohistochemistry, and John Franklin Enders, who was a co-recipient of the 1954 Nobel Prize in Physiology or Medicine.

=== Last years ===
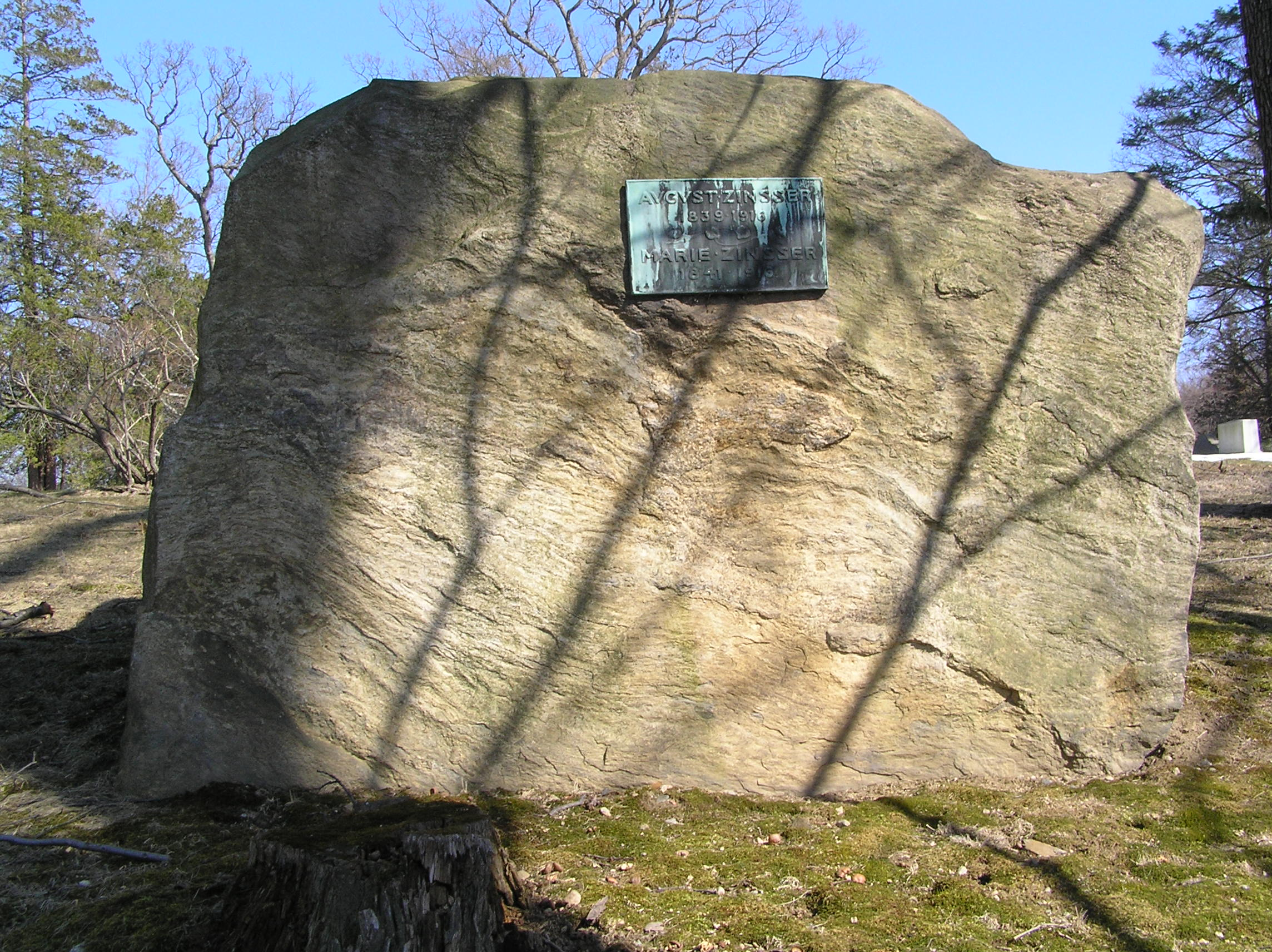
The gravesite of Hans Zinsser

Diagnosed with lymphatic leukemia in 1938, Zinsser continued working at Harvard Medical School for another two years. During that time, he completed his unique autobiography, As I Remember Him: The Biography of R.S. (it was later learned the initials "R.S." stood for "Romantic Self"); he wrote the book "in the form of the biography of a third person—a friend whom he knew very well." As I Remember Him was a non-fiction bestseller and won a National Book Award.

Hans Zinsser died of leukemia on September 4, 1940. He was 61. He is interred in Sleepy Hollow Cemetery in Sleepy Hollow, New York.

== Selected bibliography ==
- Infection and Resistance: An Exposition of the Biological Phenomena Underlying the Occurrence of Infection and the Recovery of the Animal Body from Infectious Disease. New York: The Macmillan Company. 1914. OCLC 3172461.
- A Text-book of Bacteriology: A Practical Treatise for Students and Practitioners of Medicine (4th ed.). New York: D. Appleton and Company. 1918. LCCN 18008310. Co-written with Philip Hanson Hiss.
- "Problems of the Bacteriologist in His Relations to Medicine and the Public Health" (Presidential Address, delivered December 29, 1926), Journal of Bacteriology, Vol.13, No.3 (March 1927), pp. 147–162.
- A Laboratory Course in Serum Study (2nd ed.). New York: The Macmillan Company. 1921. LCCN 21008376. Co-written with Joseph Gardner Hopkins and Reuben Ottenberg.
- Peabody, Francis Weld (1930). "Introduction by Hans Zinsser". Doctor and Patient: Papers on the Relationship of the Physician to Men and Institutions. New York: The Macmillan Company.
- Resistance to Infectious Diseases. New York: The Macmillan Company. 1931. LCCN 31012720.
- Rats, Lice and History: Being a Study in Biography, Which, After Twelve Preliminary Chapters Indispensable for the Preparation of the Lay Reader, Deals with the Life History of Typhus Fever. Boston: Little, Brown for the Atlantic Monthly Press. 1935. LCCN 36017603.
- As I Remember Him: The Biography of R.S. Boston: Little, Brown and Company. 1940. LCCN 40027536.
- Spring, Summer and Autumn: Poems. New York: Alfred A. Knopf. 1942.

== See also ==
- Brill–Zinsser disease
- Rats, Lice and History
