= Bernhard Nocht Institute for Tropical Medicine =

German medical research institute

Coordinates: 53°32′49″N 9°57′54″E

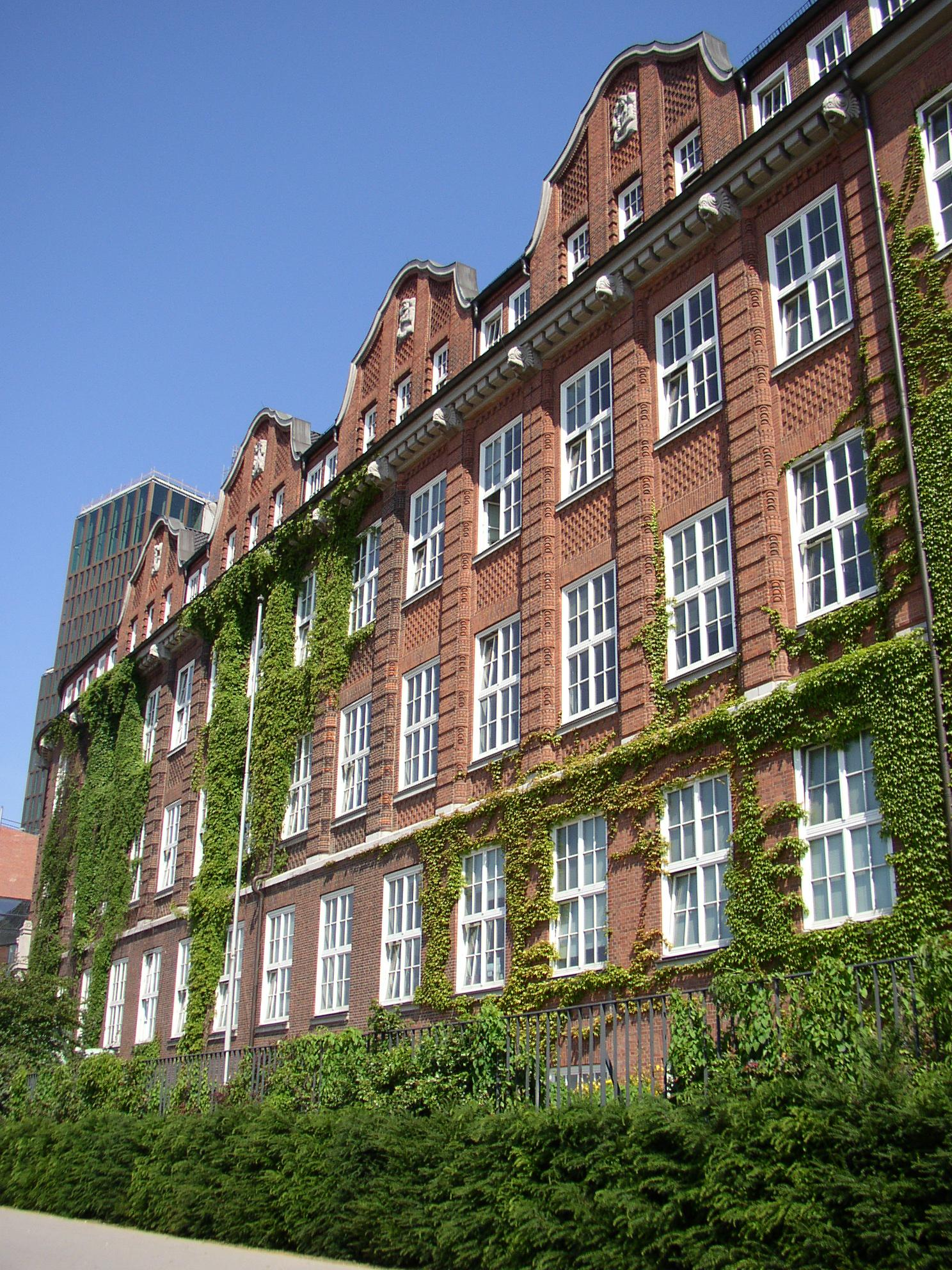
Bernhard Nocht Institute

Bernhard Nocht Institute for Tropical Medicine (Bernhard-Nocht-Institut für Tropenmedizin) (BNITM) in Hamburg is Germany's largest institution for tropical medicine, with a workforce of about 250 people in Hamburg. It is member of the Leibniz-Association.

== History ==
The cholera epidemic of the year 1892 claimed thousands of lives and prompted the Senate and Parliament of the City of Hamburg to reform the health care system. The Tropical Medicine Institute was founded with the support of the Imperial Government to research ship and tropical diseases and to train ship and colonial physicians. In 1893, the naval physician Bernhard Nocht was introduced to the newly created position of port physician. For the medical care of seamen suffering from internal diseases, he was also given a department in the St. Georg General Hospital. Contrary to the plans of the bacteriologist Robert Koch, Nocht established Hamburg in 1899 as the location for an institute for the research of tropical diseases, since "due to overseas traffic there are many people with treatment needs at this point". On 1 October 1900 the "Institute for Maritime and Tropical Diseases" with 24 employees was opened in the former administration building of the naval hospital at Hamburg's Landungsbrücken. Since 2006, the inpatient care has taken place at the University Medical Center Hamburg-Eppendorf.

== Building ==
Between 1910 and 1914, the three-part clinker building with laboratory wing, hospital and animal house was built according to plans by Fritz Schumacher. The building wing is located in the St. Pauli district between Bernhard Nocht Street on the high north side and the slope of Davidstreet leading down to the harbor shore. After 1945 the building, damaged by bombs, was re-built. From 2003 a new wing was built on the site of the former animal house, which was put into operation at the end of January 2008. In particular, the high-security laboratories were completely redesigned and have since then been among the safest in the world (biosafety level 4). The numerous decorative reliefs on the façade of the old building were created by the artist Johann Michael Bossard. The buildings of the Regional Centre of the German Weather Service and the Federal Maritime and Hydrographic Agency are located in the course of the road to the east.

== Research ==
The institute is divided into three research sections: the Molecular Biology and Immunology Division, the Clinical Research Division and the Epidemiology and Diagnostics Division. The National Reference Centre for Tropical Pathogens is also located at BNITM. Until the end of 2007, the Bernhard Nocht Institute was supported by the Federal Ministry of Health and the Ministry of Social Affairs, Family, Health and Consumer Protection of the Free and Hanseatic City of Hamburg. On 1 January 2008, the BNITM merged into the Leibniz Association.

The Institute's current scientific focus is on malaria, haemorrhagic fever viruses (Lassa, Marburg, Ebola and Crimean Congo Virus), on immunology, epidemiology and clinical studies of tropical infections as well as on the mechanisms of the viral transmission by mosquitoes. For the handling of highly pathogenic viruses and infected insects, the Institute has laboratories of the highest biosafety level (BSL-4) and a BSL-3 insectary. The BNITM comprises the National Reference Centre for the detection of all tropical pathogens and the WHO Collaborating Centre for arboviruses and haemorrhagic fever viruses.

Recent successes of the institute include the identification and development of a test for the SARS pathogen (Christian Drosten, Stephan Günther 2003), the development of new therapeutic approaches against nematodes, especially in river blindness (Achim Hörauf 1998), on bacteria living symbiotically with the worms, and the clarification of a still missing transitional stage of the malaria pathogen (the merosome, Volker Heussler 2006). The couple Paul Racz and Klara Tenner-Racz from the Institute's Pathology Department is also known for their achievements in AIDS research.

=== Research contributions ===
The following list contains a few of the contributions made at the Bernhard Nocht Institute:

- 1904 Nocht's assistant, chemist Gustav Giemsa creates the Giemsa stain, an improvement of the existing Romanowsky stain.
- 1916 Pathologist Henrique da Rocha Lima identifies the causative agent (Rickettsia prowazeki) of epidemic typhus.
- 1911-1926 Improvements regarding malaria therapy are made; experimentation is concentrated on producing effective derivatives of quinine to reduce side-effects.
- 1918 Dr. Rocha-Lima identifies the causative agent of trench fever (Rochalimea quintana), later renamed Borrelia.
- 1943 The discovery concerning the missing part of the reproduction cycle of Plasmodium praecox in bird malaria is made.
- 1950 Helminthologist Hans Vogel demonstrates that macaques can be immunized against Schistosoma japonicum, the cause of Far Eastern schistosomiasis.
- 1961 Dr. Vogel publishes the life cycle of Echinococcus multilocularis.
- 1968 Dr. Mueller identifies the Marburg virus in electronmicroscopy.
- 1985 In a joint project with American scientists, Paul Racz and Klara Tenner-Racz exhibit that in patients infected with HIV, massive viral replication takes place in the lymph nodes.
- 2003 BNITM virologists identify the SARS virus as a Coronavirus

== Directors ==
- 1900–1930: Bernhard Nocht
- 1930–1933: Friedrich Fülleborn
- 1933–1943: Peter Mühlens
- 1943–1963: Ernst Georg Nauck (1897–1967), provisional director from 1943 to 1947
- 1963–1968: Hans Vogel (1900–1980)
- 1968–1982: Hans-Harald Schumacher
- 1982–1988: a three-member board of directors manages the business
- 1988–1995: Hans J. Müller-Eberhard (1927–1998)
- 1996–2007: Bernhard Fleischer (born 1950)

Since 2008, the institute has been headed by a board of trustees. It consists of three scientists and the commercial director. The first chairman of the board was the physician Rolf Horstmann, who had headed the Department of Tropical Medicine Basic Research at the BNITM since 1998. Bernhard Fleischer was deputy chairman. The third member of the board was Egbert Tannich. In early 2018, Egbert Tannich took up his position as Chairman of the Institute's Board of Directors. In addition to managing director Birgit Müller, Jürgen May and Stephan Günther joined the board. The research groups also underwent restructuring: Egbert Tannich took over the establishment of the "Infection Diagnostics" department. Michael Ramharter was appointed to the W3 professorship "Clinical Tropical Medicine" at the University Hospital Hamburg-Eppendorf and moved to the BNITM with his department "Clinical Research".

== Other ==
Today, the research priorities are divided between the Robert Koch Institute (RKI) and the BNITM. While the BNITM is responsible for research abroad, the RKI is responsible for issues on research and hygiene within Germany

A branch office of the Institute was located in the hospital of the German mining settlement of Bong Town in the West African state of Liberia, which was closed in the 1990s as a result of the civil war.

On 23 February 2015, Health Minister Hermann Gröhe visited the BNITM.

As a member of the scientific community Gottfried Wilhelm Leibniz (Wissenschaftsgemeinschaft WGL), the Institute is institutionally funded by the Federal Government and the Federal States as a "research institute of supra-regional importance".

Among the population the BNITM is also known as "The Tropical Institute" or is sometimes colloquially referred to as "Tropical Hospital".

The German Armed Forces Hospital Hamburg closely cooperates with the BNITM, so that, i.a the Tropical Medicine Department of the German Armed Forces Hospital has been accommodated in the BNITM since 2005.

Since 2006 there is no more hospital operation at the BNITM. The Bernhard Nocht Medal for Tropical Medicine is awarded by the Bernhard Nocht Institute and the German Society for Tropical Medicine and Global Health; the winner gives a lecture in Hamburg. Some of the prize winners, such as Walter Kikuth and Hans Vogel, also did research at the Bernhard Nocht Institute.

At the end of January 2020, Chairman Tannich attracted considerable public attention in Germany when he characterized, on one of the major national TV channels (ARD), coronavirus SARS-CoV2 as object of a media hype: "We are surprised at what lengths there is now media coverage, at its intensity, and how much space is assigned to it. We are astonished how often it is repeated again and again." Tannich emphasized "that the danger posed by the virus [SARS-CoV2] is significantly smaller than some thought at the beginning."

== Literature ==
- Erich Mannweiler: History of the Institute for Ship and Tropical Diseases in Hamburg 1900-1945. Goecke and Evers, Keltern-Weiler 1998. (= essays of the Scientific Society in Hamburg. N.F. Vol. 32). ISBN 3-931374-32-7.
- Barbara Ebert (editor): Bernhard-Nocht-Institut Hamburg 1900–2000. 100 years Bernhard Nocht Institute for Tropical Medicine. Bernhard Nocht Institute for Tropical Medicine, Hamburg 2000. ISBN 3-921762-01-4. (Catalogue for the exhibition on the 100th anniversary of the Tropical Institute)
- Sven Tode: Research - Treatment - Training: 100 Years of the Hamburg Tropical Institute. Bernhard-Nocht Institute for Tropical Medicine, Hamburg 2000, ISBN 3-921762-02-2 (included): Erich Mannweiler: Scientific works from one hundred years of tropical medicine in Hamburg).
- Stefan Wulf: The Hamburg Tropical Institute 1919 to 1945. Foreign Cultural Policy and Colonial Revisionism after Versailles, Dietrich Reimer Publisher, Berlin / Hamburg 1994, ISBN 3-496-02537-9.

== See also ==
- Travel medicine
- Liverpool School of Tropical Medicine
- Prince Leopold Institute of Tropical Medicine (Belgium)
- Royal Society of Tropical Medicine and Hygiene
- Jonas Schmidt-Chanasit
