= Stanislaus von Prowazek =

Czech parasitologist (1875–1915)

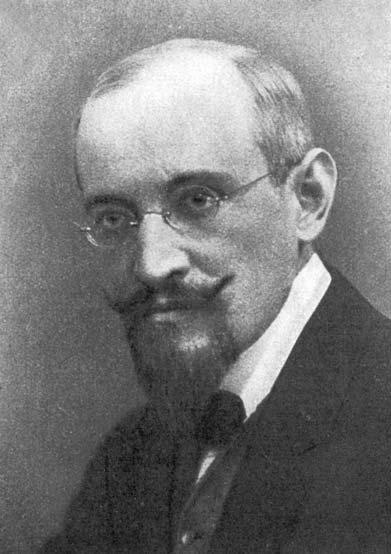
- Born: 12 November 1875; Jindřichův Hradec, Bohemia
- Died: 17 February 1915 (aged 39); Cottbus, Brandenburg, Germany
- Citizenship: Czech
- Education: University of Vienna (PhD)
- Known for: Chlamydia trachomatis — trachoma Rickettsia prowazekii — epidemic typhus
- Scientific career
- Fields: Zoology, parasitology
- Workplaces: University of Berlin; Bernhard-Nocht-Institut für Tropenmedizin
- Doctoral advisor: Berthold Hatschek

Stanislaus Josef Mathias von Prowazek, Edler von Lanow (12 November 1875 Jindřichův Hradec, Bohemia – 17 February 1915, Cottbus), born Stanislav Provázek, was a Czech zoologist and parasitologist, who made notable contributions to infectious diseases and their causative pathogens. He and Ludwig Halberstädter were the first to describe the pathogen of trachoma. Along with Brazilian pathologist Henrique da Rocha Lima, he discovered the pathogen of epidemic typhus, which bears an eponymous scientific name Rickettsia prowazekii.

== Biography ==
Prowazek was born on 12 November 1875 and baptised the next day, which was St Stanislaus Day, from which he got his first name. His father Colonel Joseph von Provézek was chief of the Austro-Hungarian Army garrison in Jindřichův Hradec. His father was enobled in 1893, while he was studying at Plzeň Gymnasium and changed his name spelling to Prowazek.

In 1895, Prowazek entered Charles University to study science and philosophy. He was most influenced in zoology by the teachings of zoologist Berthold Hatschek. As he finished his fourth semester, Carl Isidor Cori, director of Zoological Institute of Prague, recruited him as a demonstrator. In 1897, Hatschek became professor at the University of Vienna and Prowazek followed him there. In Vienna, a mathematician-physicist Ernst Mach became his major influence in philosophy. The philosophical inspiration made him a prolific writer, and his first paper "Zufall oder Gesetz" ("Chance or law") appeared in the Austrian journal Natur in 1897. In 1899, he earned a doctorate (DPhil) on a thesis Protozoenstudien (Study of Protozoans), which was subsequently published in a series of papers. His supervisor Richard von Wettstein, was a botanist and had little interest in his research, and no one paid attention to protozoology that he worked entirely on his own. [His research papers had no co-authors.]

In 1901, he became assistant to immunologist Paul Ehrlich at the Institute for Experimental Therapy (later named Paul Ehrlich Institute) in Hesse, near Frankfurt. At the time Ehrlich thought that cancer could be caused by bacteria or protozoans. Prowazek found no such organisms associated with cancer development. However, while studying the tumour development in plants caused by slime moulds, specifically myxomycetes, he discovered the sexual life cycle of the fungi. When a zoologist and embryologist Richard von Hertwig at the Ludwig-Maximilians-Universität München, learned the news, he offered Prowazek a scientist position to work on reproduction in protists.

While researching on protozoans, Prowazek often stayed at Trieste marine station where he met Fritz Schaudinn, an expert in pathogenic protozoans who eventually discovered the causative pathogen of syphilis as a bacterium Spirochaeta pallida (later renamed Treponema pallidum). Guided by Schaudinn, Prowazek focussed his research on protozoal infections. In 1905, Schaudinn became director of the zoological section (parasitology department) at the Institut für Schiffs- und Tropenkrankheiten (later renamed Bernhard-Nocht-Institut für Tropenmedizin) in Hamburg. Prowazek simultaneously was appointed Schaudinn's deputy and position at the Charlottenburg Imperial Sanitary Board Institute. Schaudinn died in June 1906 while Prowazek was on an expedition to Southeast Asia. Prowazek returned to Hamburg in 1907 and was made Schaudinn's successor.

From the start of his service in Hamburg to the end of his life, Prowazek had little time in his offices as he was assigned on several medical expeditions. During 1906 and 1907, he joined Albert Neisser in a federal sponsored expedition to Java, Indonesia. Neisser's expedition was to investigate the nature and transmission of syphilis. Around that time Schaudinn and Erich Hoffmann had established a bacterium as a causative pathogen of syphilis so that Prowazek turned his attention to other tropical infections like trachoma and elephantiasis. In 1908, he conducted research on trypanosomiasis and viral infections (vaccinia and variola) and teaching at the Instituto Oswaldo Cruz, outside Rio de Janeiro. Between 1910 and 1912, he carried out investigations of infectious diseases in Dutch and German colonies of Pacific islands such as Sumatra, German Samoa, Yap and Saipan. In 1913, he worked at the Balkans, Japanese islands and nearby islands like Mariana Islands. He was impressed by the indigenous culture of the Pacific islands that he wrote a ecological and cultural book Die Deutschen Marianen, ihre Natur und Geschichte.

== Scientific contributions ==
=== Trachoma ===
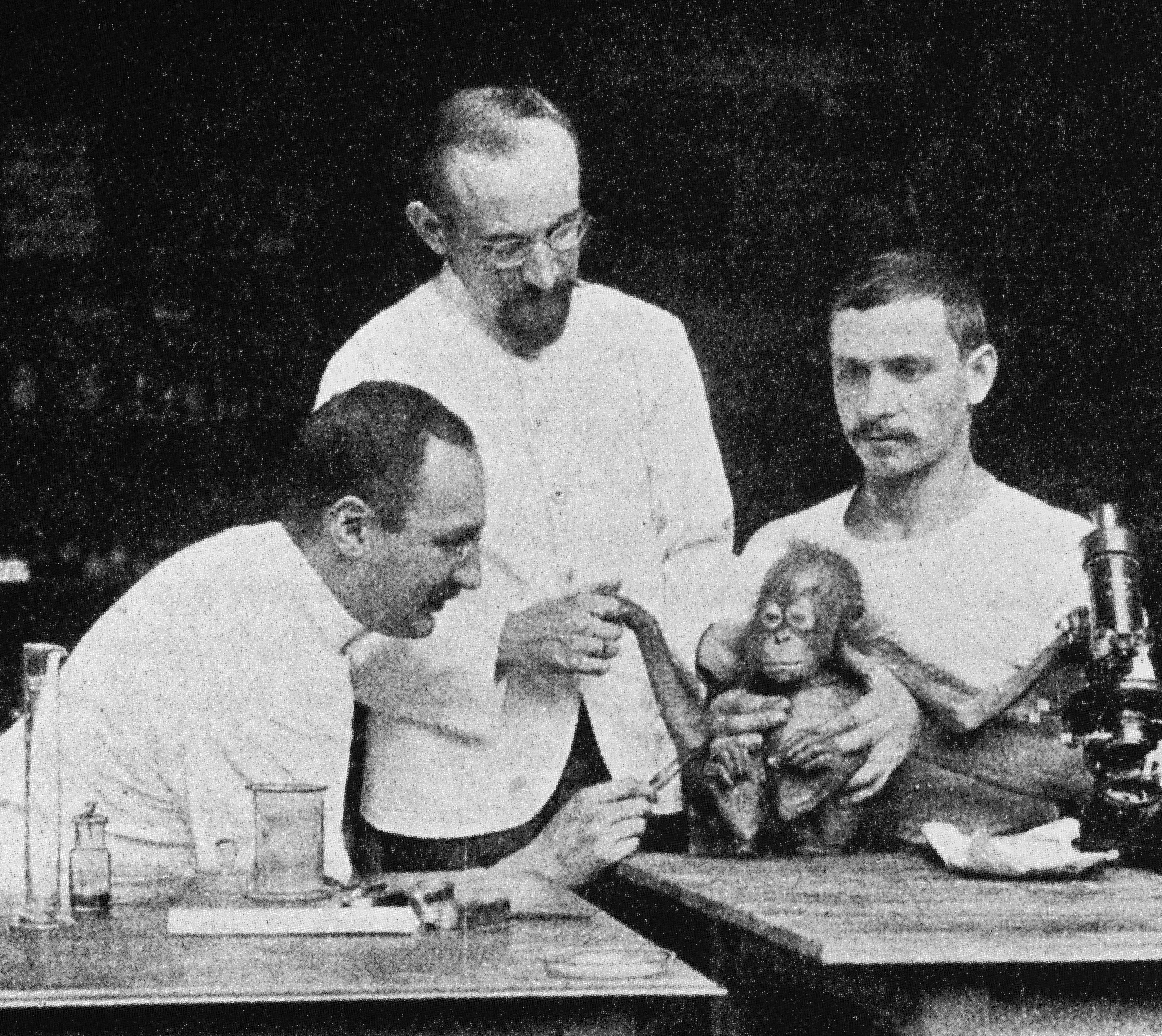
Ludwig Halberstaedter (left) and Stanislaus von Prowazek (centre) conducting studying trachoma.

During Neisser's expedition of 1906, Prowazek came across cases of eye infection called trachoma. With his companion Ludwig Halberstädter, Prowazek analysed one individual in Batavia (now Jakarta) with the infection. They identified specific tissue particles known as inclusion bodies in the eye epithelium. These inclusion bodies became the clinical diagnostic feature of the disease and became known as Prowazek bodies or Halberstädter-Prowazek bodies. Prowazek and Halberstädter identified the causative pathogen as a protozoan. However, other scientists believed that the pathogen could be a virus. In 1933, Brazilian ophthalmologist Archimede Busacca identified the trachoma inclusion bodies contained rickettsia, which he called as "a new category of germs", and gave the name Rickettsia trachomae. By the 1960s, it was resolved that the pathogen was a distinct bacterium, not rickettsial, and renamed Chlamydia trachomatis.

=== Epidemic typhus and death ===
Epidemic typhus is one of the deadliest infections in human history and mostly associated with poverty and wars. It is regarded as the major determinant of the "outcome of more wars than have soldiers and generals." During the 19th century wars in Europe and the American Civil War, it is estimated that more people die of the disease than the battle wounds. Understanding the nature and cause of the disease was important not only in public health but also in warfare.

In 1909, French physician Charles Nicolle at the Pasteur Institute in Tunis discovered that epidemic typhus is transmitted by human body louse. It was the first scientific milestone and earned Nicolle the 1928 Nobel Prize in Physiology or Medicine. At the time, American microbiologist Howard Taylor Ricketts had been studying Rocky Mountain spotted fever, which he discovered was transmitted by ticks. Upon the news of Nicolle's discovery he confirmed that epidemic typhus was transmitted by body louse and that it was fundamentally similar to the tick-borne disease. Nicolle demonstrated that the infection could be induced from body lice into the bloods of chimpanzees and then to monkeys (macaques), as well as between monkeys. While trying to work out the mode of infection, Ricketts contracted the disease in Mexico and died in 1910. Although Ricketts was able to associate the disease with some microbes, the exact pathogen and way of transmission remained to be discovered.

In 1913, Prowazek and Carl Theodor Hegler investigated epidemic typhus in Serbia. The next year, he and a Brazilian physician Henrique da Rocha Lima, who he helped to become director of the department of pathology at the Institute for Maritime and Tropical Diseases in Hamburg, went to Istanbul to for another outbreak of epidemic typhus. As World War I broke out in August 1914, the Russian troops spread the disease in East Prussia. The disease was by then popularly called the "jail fever." The Prussian Ministry of War assigned Prowazek and Rocha Lima to investigate the outbreak. They were stationed at the German prisoner-of-war camp hospital in Cottbus. They soon confirmed Ricketts's observation that microbes were responsible for the disease and discovered that body lice transmit the disease from faeces. While experimenting with the pathogen they both contracted an infection. In early February, Prowazek developed symptoms of the disease and died on 17 February 1915. Rocha Lima survived and later identified the infectious agent of epidemic typhus as a new species of bacterium which he named Rickettsia prowazekii in 1916. He chose the name after the two "martyrs" of the epidemic typhus, Ricketts and Prowazek.

== Publications ==
Prowazek published around 200 papers many of which covered philosophy. His major scientific works are:

- Die pathogenen Protozoen (mit Ausnahme der Hämosporidien) (with Franz Theodor Doflein) – in Kolle and Wassermann's Handbuch der pathogenen Microorganismen. Jena, 1903, volume I: 865–1006.
- Über Zelleinschlüsse parasitärer Natur beim Trachom. Arbeiten aus dem Kaiserlichen Gesundheitsamte, Berlin, 1907, 26: 44–47. with Ludwig Halberstädter.
- Zur Aetiologie des Trachoms. Deutsche medizinische Wochenschrift, August 1907, 33: 1285.1287. with Ludwig Halberstädter.
- Einführung in die Physiologie der Einzelligen (1910).
- Zur Kenntnis der Giemsafärbung vom Standpunkt der Zytologie. - 1914. Digital edition by the University and State Library Düsseldorf (in German).
- Handbuch der pathogenen Protozoen (1912).
