= Shower train =

Trains providing bathing facilities

Shower trains or bathing trains were specialized trains or train cars used throughout Europe to provide mobile bathing facilities to troops stationed along the battlefront during the First World War, as well as to civilians to combat epidemics in the early 20th century.

== World War I ==
The Swiss army shower train at a station.

Shower room in a Swiss train.

=== Switzerland ===
Shower trains (known as Armeebadezug) were used in Switzerland. Each train consisted of old rolling stock from private railway companies: a locomotive, a tank car and converted passenger cars, each with a shower room and two cloakrooms. The water was taken from the tank car and heated by the locomotive.

This train served the thousands of Swiss militia protecting Switzerland's borders.

=== Imperial Russia ===
Similar bathing trains were used in the Russian Empire by the Red Cross between 1914 and 1917.

== Public sanitation ==
Beginning in 1919, following the model set by their military use, shower trains were used in Eastern Europe to combat a widespread louse-born typhus epidemic. The disease had been endemic in Eastern Europe, but became widespread during and following World War I. The first train was deployed in early 1919. On this train, a disinfection car—a repurposed refrigeration unit—was situated directly behind the locomotive. Clothes were steamed in high temperatures to kill parasites and their eggs. The next three cars were repurposed passenger wagons and consisted of an undressing room, the shower car, and a redressing room. A one-way system was put in place to reduce the risk of recontamination. At the rear were cars for soiled clothing, a laundry, and a seamstress station and living quarters.
