= Epidemic typhus =

Bacterial infection spread by body lice

Typhus
- Other names: Camp fever, jail fever, hospital fever, ship fever, famine fever, putrid fever, petechial fever, epidemic louse-borne typhus, louse-borne typhus
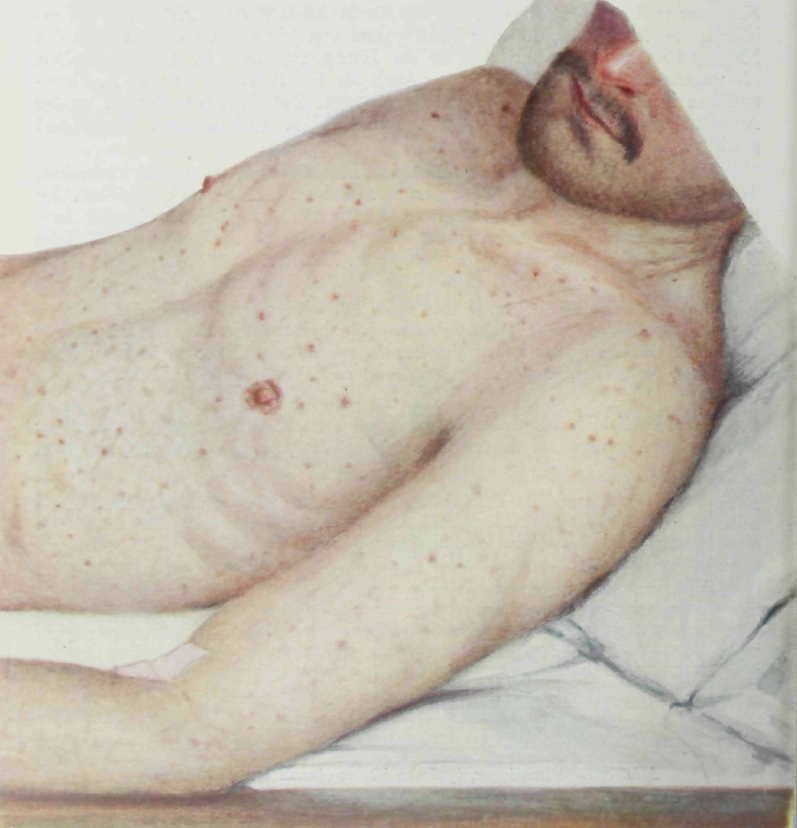
- Rash caused by epidemic typhus
- Specialty: Infectious diseases

Epidemic typhus, also known as louse-borne typhus, is a form of typhus so named because the disease often causes epidemics following wars and natural disasters where civil life is disrupted. Epidemic typhus is spread to people through contact with infected body lice, in contrast to endemic typhus which is usually transmitted by fleas.

Though typhus has been responsible for millions of deaths throughout history, it is still considered a rare disease that occurs mainly in populations that suffer unhygienic extreme overcrowding. Typhus is most rare in industrialized countries. It occurs primarily in the colder, mountainous regions of central and east Africa, as well as Central and South America. The causative organism is Rickettsia prowazekii, transmitted by the human body louse (Pediculus humanus corporis). Untreated typhus cases have a fatality rate of approximately 40%.

Epidemic typhus should not be confused with murine typhus, which is more endemic to the United States, particularly Southern California and Texas. This form of typhus has similar symptoms but is caused by Rickettsia typhi, is less deadly, and has different vectors for transmission.

== Signs and symptoms ==
Symptoms of this disease typically begin within 2 weeks of contact with the causative organism. Signs/symptoms may include:

- Fever
- Chills
- Headache
- Confusion
- Cough
- Rapid breathing
- Body/muscle aches
- Rash
- Nausea
- Vomiting

After 5–6 days, a macular skin eruption develops: first on the upper trunk and spreading to the rest of the body (though the face, palms, and soles of the feet are rarely affected).

Brill–Zinsser disease, first described by Nathan Brill in 1913 at Mount Sinai Hospital in New York City, is a mild form of epidemic typhus that recurs in someone after a long period of latency (similar to the relationship between chickenpox and shingles). This recurrence often arises in times of relative immunosuppression, which is often in the context of a person suffering malnutrition or other illnesses. In combination with poor sanitation and hygiene in times of social chaos and upheaval, which enable a greater density of lice, this reactivation is why typhus generates epidemics in such conditions.

=== Complications ===
Complications are as follows:

- Myocarditis
- Endocarditis
- Mycotic aneurysm
- Pneumonia
- Pancreatitis
- Kidney or bladder infections
- Acute renal failure
- Meningitis
- Encephalitis
- Myelitis
- Septic shock

== Transmission ==
Feeding on a human who carries the bacterium infects the louse. R. prowazekii grows in the louse's gut and is excreted in its feces. The louse transmits the disease by biting an uninfected human, who scratches the louse bite (which itches) and rubs the feces into the wound. The incubation period is one to two weeks. R. prowazekii can remain viable and virulent in the dried louse feces for many days. Typhus will eventually kill the louse, though the disease will remain viable for many weeks in the dead louse.

Epidemic typhus has historically occurred during times of war and deprivation. For example, typhus killed millions of prisoners in German Nazi concentration camps during World War II. The unhygenic conditions in camps such as Auschwitz, Theresienstadt, and Bergen-Belsen allowed diseases such as typhus to flourish. Situations in the twenty-first century with potential for a typhus epidemic would include refugee camps during a major famine or natural disaster. In the periods between outbreaks, when human to human transmission occurs less often, the flying squirrel serves as a zoonotic reservoir for the Rickettsia prowazekii bacterium.

In 1916, Henrique da Rocha Lima proved that the bacterium Rickettsia prowazekii was the agent responsible for typhus. He named it after his colleague Stanislaus von Prowazek, who had along with himself become infected with typhus while investigating an outbreak, subsequently dying, and H. T. Ricketts, another zoologist who had died from typhus while investigating it. Once these crucial facts were recognized, Rudolf Weigl in 1930 was able to fashion a practical and effective vaccine production method. He ground up the insides of infected lice that had been drinking blood. It was, however, very dangerous to produce, and carried a high likelihood of infection to those who were working on it.

A safer mass-production-ready method using egg yolks was developed by Herald R. Cox in 1938. This vaccine was widely available and used extensively by 1943.

== Diagnosis ==
IFA, ELISA or PCR positive after 10 days.

== Treatment ==
The infection is treated with antibiotics. Intravenous fluids and oxygen may be needed to stabilize the patient. There is a significant disparity between the untreated mortality and treated mortality rates: 10-60% untreated versus close to 0% treated with antibiotics within 8 days of initial infection. Tetracycline, chloramphenicol, and doxycycline are commonly used.

Some of the simplest methods of prevention and treatment focus on preventing infestation of body lice. Completely changing the clothing, washing the infested clothing in hot water, and in some cases also treating recently used bedsheets all help to prevent typhus by removing potentially infected lice. Clothes left unworn and unwashed for 7 days also result in the death of both lice and their eggs, as they have no access to a human host. Another form of lice prevention requires dusting infested clothing with a powder consisting of 10% DDT, 1% malathion, or 1% permethrin, which kill lice and their eggs.

Other preventive measures for individuals are to avoid unhygienic, extremely overcrowded areas where the causative organisms can jump from person to person. In addition, they are warned to keep a distance from larger rodents that carry lice, such as rats, squirrels, or opossums.

== History ==
=== History of outbreaks ===
==== Before 19th century ====
During the second year of the Peloponnesian War (430 BC), the city-state of Athens in ancient Greece had an epidemic, known as the Plague of Athens, which killed, among others, Pericles and his two elder sons. The plague returned twice more, in 429 BC and in the winter of 427/6 BC. Epidemic typhus is proposed as a strong candidate for the cause of this disease outbreak, supported by both medical and scholarly opinions.

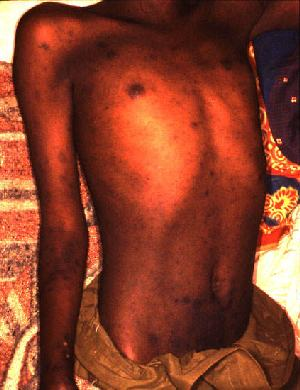
Rash caused by epidemic typhus in Burundi

The first description of typhus was probably given in 1083 at La Cava abbey near Salerno, Italy. In 1546, Girolamo Fracastoro, a Florentine physician, described typhus in his famous treatise on viruses and contagion, De Contagione et Contagiosis Morbis.

Typhus was carried to mainland Europe by soldiers who had been fighting on Cyprus. The first reliable description of the disease appears during the siege of the Emirate of Granada by the Catholic Monarchs in 1489 during the Granada War. These accounts include descriptions of fever and red spots over arms, back and chest, progressing to delirium, gangrenous sores, and the stench of rotting flesh. During the siege, the Catholics lost 3,000 men to enemy action, but an additional 17,000 died of typhus.

Typhus was also common in prisons (and in crowded conditions where lice spread easily), where it was known as Gaol fever or Jail fever. Gaol fever often occurs when prisoners are frequently huddled together in dark, filthy rooms. Imprisonment until the next term of court was often equivalent to a death sentence. Typhus was so infectious that prisoners brought before the court sometimes infected the court itself. Following the Black Assize of Oxford 1577, over 510 died from epidemic typhus, including Speaker Robert Bell, Lord Chief Baron of the Exchequer. The outbreak that followed, between 1577 and 1579, killed about 10% of the English population.

During the Lent assize held at Taunton (1730), typhus caused the death of the Lord Chief Baron of the Exchequer, the High Sheriff of Somerset, the sergeant, and hundreds of other persons. During a time when there were 241 capital offences, more prisoners died from 'gaol fever' than were put to death by all the public executioners in the realm. In 1759 an English authority estimated that each year a quarter of the prisoners had died from gaol fever. In London, typhus frequently broke out among the ill-kept prisoners of Newgate Gaol and moved into the general city population.

==== 19th century ====
Epidemics occurred in the British Isles and throughout Europe, for instance, during the English Civil War, the Thirty Years' War, and the Napoleonic Wars. Many historians believe that the typhus outbreak among Napoleon's troops is the real reason why he stalled his military campaign into Russia, rather than starvation or the cold. In 1813, a prolonged typhus epidemic in Germany would reach a critical point following the Battle of Leipzig due to the ensuing mass casualties and poor sanitation. The cities of Würzburg, Aschaffenburg, and Mainz were among the worst affected. In Leipzig, Friedrich Wagner, father of the composer Richard Wagner, was among those who perished. Of Germany's entire population, at least one in ten fell sick and at least 250,000 people died. The death toll of the epidemic vastly exceeded that of the battle itself.

A major epidemic occurred in Ireland between 1816 and 1819, and again in the late 1830s. Another major typhus epidemic occurred during the Great Irish Famine between 1846 and 1849. The Irish typhus spread to England, where it was sometimes called "Irish fever" and was noted for its virulence. It killed people of all social classes since lice were endemic and inescapable, but it hit particularly hard in the lower or "unwashed" social strata. It was carried to North America by the many Irish refugees who fled the famine. In Canada, the 1847 North American typhus epidemic killed more than 20,000 people, mainly Irish immigrants in fever sheds and other forms of quarantine, who had contracted the disease aboard coffin ships. As many as 900,000 deaths have been attributed to the typhus fever during the Crimean War in 1853–1856, and 270,000 to the 1866 Finnish typhus epidemic.

In the United States, a typhus epidemic struck Philadelphia in 1837. The son of Franklin Pierce died in 1843 of a typhus epidemic in Concord, New Hampshire. Several epidemics occurred in Baltimore, Memphis, and Washington, D.C. between 1865 and 1873. Typhus fever was also a significant killer during the American Civil War, although typhoid fever was the more prevalent cause of US Civil War "camp fever." Typhoid is a completely different disease from typhus. Typically more men died on both sides of disease than wounds.

Rudolph Carl Virchow, a physician, anthropologist, and historian attempted to control an outbreak of typhus in Upper Silesia and wrote a 190-page report about it. He concluded that the solution to the outbreak did not lie in individual treatment or by providing small changes in housing, food or clothing, but rather in widespread structural changes to directly address the issue of poverty. Virchow's experience in Upper Silesia led to his observation that "Medicine is a social science". His report led to changes in German public health policy.

==== 20th century ====
Typhus was endemic in Poland and several neighboring countries prior to World War I (1914–1918). During and shortly after the war, epidemic typhus caused up to three million deaths in Russia, and several million citizens also died in Poland and Romania. Since 1914, many troops, prisoners and even doctors were infected, and at least 150,000 died from typhus in Serbia, 50,000 of whom were prisoners. Delousing stations were established for troops on the Western Front, but the disease ravaged the armies of the Eastern Front. Fatalities were generally between 10 and 40 percent of those infected, and the disease was a major cause of death for those nursing the sick. During World War I and the Russian Civil War between the White and Red, the typhus epidemic caused 2–3 million deaths out of 20–30 million cases in Russia between 1918 and 1922.

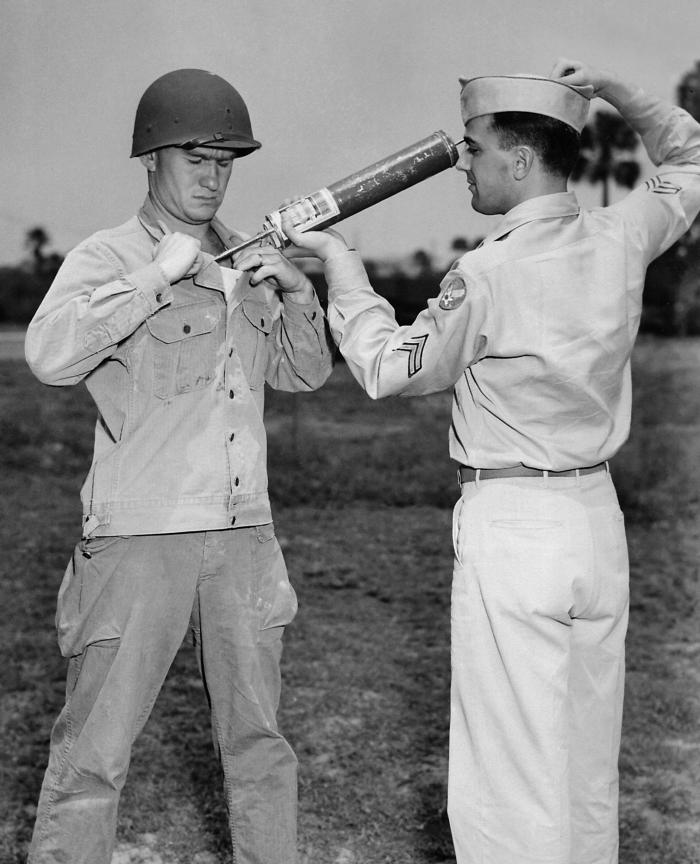
A U.S. soldier demonstrating DDT-hand spraying equipment. DDT was used to control the spread of typhus-carrying lice during WWII.

Typhus caused hundreds of thousands of deaths during World War II. It struck the German Army during Operation Barbarossa, the invasion of Russia, in 1941. In 1942 and 1943 typhus hit French North Africa, Egypt and Iran particularly hard. Typhus epidemics killed inmates in the Nazi concentration camps and death camps such as Auschwitz, Dachau, Theresienstadt, and Bergen-Belsen. Footage shot at Bergen-Belsen concentration camp shows the mass graves for typhus victims. Anne Frank, at age 15, and her sister Margot both died of typhus in the camps. Even larger epidemics in the post-war chaos of Europe were averted only by the widespread use of the newly discovered DDT to kill lice on the millions of refugees and displaced persons.

Following the development of a vaccine during World War II, Western Europe and North America have been able to prevent epidemics. These have usually occurred in Eastern Europe, the Middle East, and parts of Africa, particularly Ethiopia. Naval Medical Research Unit Five worked there with the government on research to attempt to eradicate the disease.

In one of its first major outbreaks since World War II, epidemic typhus reemerged in 1995 in a jail in N'Gozi, Burundi. This outbreak followed the start of the Burundian Civil War in 1993, which caused the displacement of 760,000 people. Refugee camps were crowded and unsanitary, and often far from towns and medical services.

==== 21st century ====
A 2005 study found seroprevalence of R. prowazekii antibodies in homeless populations in two shelters in Marseille, France. The study noted the "hallmarks of epidemic typhus and relapsing fever".

=== History of vaccines ===
Major developments for typhus vaccines started during World War I, as typhus caused high mortality, and threatened the health and readiness for soldiers on the battlefield. Vaccines for typhus, like other vaccines of the time, were classified as either living or killed vaccines. Live vaccines were typically an injection of live agent, and killed vaccines are live cultures of an agent that are chemically inactivated prior to use.

Attempts to create a living vaccine of classical, louse-borne, typhus were attempted by French researchers but these proved unsuccessful. Researchers turned to murine typhus to develop a live vaccine. At the time, murine vaccine was viewed as a less severe alternative to classical typhus. Four versions of a live vaccine cultivated from murine typhus were tested, on a large scale, in 1934.

While the French were making advancements with live vaccines, other European countries were working to develop killed vaccines. During World War II, there were three kinds of potentially useful killed vaccines. All three killed vaccines relied on the cultivation of Rickettsia prowazekii, the organism responsible for typhus. The first attempt at a killed vaccine was developed by Germany, using the Rickettsia prowazekii found in louse feces. The vaccine was tested extensively in Poland between the two world wars and used by the Germans for their troops during their attacks on the Soviet Union.

A second method of growing Rickettsia prowazekii was discovered using the yolk sac of chick embryos. Germans tried several times to use this technique of growing Rickettsia prowazekii but no effort was pushed very far.

The last technique was an extended development of the previously known method of growing murine typhus in rodents. It was discovered that rabbits could be infected, by a similar process, and contract classical typhus instead of murine typhus. Again, while proven to produce suitable Rickettsia prowazekii for vaccine development, this method was not used to produce wartime vaccines.

During WWII, the two major vaccines available were the killed vaccine grown in lice and the live vaccine from France. Neither was used much during the war. The killed, louse-grown vaccine was difficult to manufacture in large enough quantities, and the French vaccine was not believed to be safe enough for use.

The Germans worked to develop their own live vaccine from the urine of typhus victims. While developing a live vaccine, Germany used live Rickettsia prowazekii to test multiple possible vaccines' capabilities. They gave live Rickettsia prowazekii to concentration camp prisoners, using them as a control group for the vaccine tests.

The use of DDT as an effective means of killing lice, the main carrier of typhus, was discovered in Naples.

== Society and culture ==
=== Biological weapon ===
Typhus was one of more than a dozen agents that the United States researched as potential biological weapons before President Richard Nixon suspended all non-defensive aspects of the U.S. biological weapons program in 1969.

=== Poverty and displacement ===
The CDC lists the following areas as active foci of human epidemic typhus: Andean regions of South America, some parts of Africa; on the other hand, the CDC only recognizes an active enzootic cycle in the United States involving flying squirrels (CDC). Though epidemic typhus is commonly thought to be restricted to areas of the developing world, serological examination of homeless persons in Houston found evidence for exposure to the bacterial pathogens that cause epidemic typhus and murine typhus. A study involving 930 homeless people in Marseille, France, found high rates of seroprevalence to R. prowazekii and a high prevalence of louse-borne infections in the homeless.

Typhus has been increasingly discovered in homeless populations in developed nations. Typhus among homeless populations is especially prevalent as these populations tend to migrate across states and countries, spreading the risk of infection with their movement. The same risk applies to refugees, who travel across country lines, often living in close proximity and unable to maintain necessary hygienic standards to avoid being at risk for catching lice possibly infected with typhus.

Because the typhus-infected lice live in clothing, the prevalence of typhus is also affected by weather, humidity, poverty and lack of hygiene. Lice, and therefore typhus, are more prevalent during colder months, especially winter and early spring. In these seasons, people tend to wear multiple layers of clothing, giving lice more places to go unnoticed by their hosts. This is particularly a problem for poverty-stricken populations as they often do not have multiple sets of clothing, preventing them from practicing good hygiene habits that could prevent louse infestation.

Due to fear of an outbreak of epidemic typhus, the US Government put a typhus quarantine in place in 1917 across the entirety of the US-Mexican border. Sanitation plants were constructed that required immigrants to be thoroughly inspected and bathed before crossing the border. Those who routinely crossed back and forth across the border for work were required to go through the sanitation process weekly, updating their quarantine card with the date of the next week's sanitation. These sanitation border stations remained active over the next two decades, regardless of the disappearance of the typhus threat. This fear of typhus and resulting quarantine and sanitation protocols dramatically hardened the border between the US and Mexico, fostering scientific and popular prejudices against Mexicans. This ultimately intensified racial tensions and fueled efforts to ban immigrants to the US from the Southern Hemisphere because the immigrants were associated with the disease.

=== Literature ===
- (1847) In Jane Eyre by Charlotte Brontë, an outbreak of typhus occurs in Jane's school Lowood, highlighting the unsanitary conditions the girls live in.
- (1862) In Fathers and Sons by Ivan Turgenev, Evgeny Bazarov dissects a local peasant and dies after contracting typhus.
- (1886) In the short story "Excellent People" by Anton Chekhov, typhus kills a Russian provincial.
- (1886) In The Strange Adventures of Captain Dangerous by George Augustus Henry Sala: "We Convicts were all had to the Grate, for the Knight and Alderman would not venture further in, for fear of the Gaol Fever;"
- (1890) In How the Other Half Lives by Jacob Riis, the effects of typhus fever and smallpox on "Jewtown" are described.
- (1935) Hans Zinsser's Rats, Lice and History, although a touch outdated on the science, contains many useful cross-references to classical and historical impact of typhus.
- (1940) in The Don Flows Home to the Sea by Mikhail Sholokhov, numerous characters contract typhus during the Russian Civil War.
- (1946) In Viktor Frankl's Man's Search for Meaning, Frankl, a Nazi concentration camp prisoner and trained psychiatrist, treats fellow prisoners for delirium due to typhus, while being occasionally affected with the disease himself.
- (1955) In Vladimir Nabokov's Lolita, Humbert Humbert's childhood sweetheart, Annabel Leigh, dies of typhus.
- (1956) In Doctor Zhivago by Boris Pasternak, the main character contracts epidemic typhus in the winter following the Russian Revolution, while living in Moscow.
- (1964) In Nacht (novel) by Edgar Hilsenrath, characters imprisoned in a ghetto in Transnistria during World War II are portrayed infected with and dying of epidemic typhus.
- (1978) In Patrick O'Brian's novel Desolation Island, an outbreak of "gaol-fever" strikes the crew while sailing aboard the Leopard.
- (1980–1991) In Maus by Art Spiegelman, Vladek Spiegelman contracts typhus during his imprisonment at the Dachau concentration camp.
- (1982) There is a typhus epidemic in Chile graphically described in The House of the Spirits by Isabel Allende
- (1996) In Andrea Barrett's novella Ship Fever, the characters struggle with a typhus outbreak at the Canadian Grosse Isle Quarantine Station during 1847.
- (2001) Lynn and Gilbert Morris' novel Where Two Seas Met portrays an outbreak of typhus on the island of Bequia in the Grenadines, in 1869.
- (2004) In Neal Stephenson's The System Of The World, a fictionalized Sir Isaac Newton dies of "gaol fever" before being resurrected by Daniel Waterhouse.

== See also ==
- Globalization and disease
- List of epidemics
- Weil-Felix test
