= Hans J. Müller-Eberhard =

German and American geneticist

- Born: Hans Joachim Müller; 5 May 1927; Magdeburg, Germany
- Died: 3 March 1998 (aged 70); Houston, Texas, USA
- Education: University of Göttingen, Rockefeller University, Uppsala University
- Known for: Research on immunoglobulins and the complement system
- Awards: Robert Koch Prize, Honorary Member of the Scandinavian Society for Immunology
- Scientific career
- Fields: Molecular Immunology
- Workplaces: Rockefeller University, Scripps Clinic and Research Foundation, Bernhard Nocht Institute for Tropical Medicine
- Academic advisors: Henry G. Kunkel, Gunnar Wallanius

Hans Joachim Müller-Eberhard (born Hans Joachim Müller, 5 May 1927, Magdeburg was a distinguished molecular immunologist who did pioneering research in the United States and his native Germany. The areas of investigation upon which he left his mark include the immunoglobulins and the complement system. Awarded the gold Robert Koch Prize in 1987. Honorary Member of the Scandinavian Society for Immunology (1973). He died on 3 March 1998 in Houston, Texas.

== Education and career ==
Müller-Eberhard studied medicine at the University of Göttingen. He spent three years with Henry G. Kunkel at the Rockefeller University, where he became interested in immunological research, and investigated γ-globulin. Later he worked at Uppsala University with Gunnar Wallanius on the complement system, and obtained his doctorate there. He returned to Rockefeller University to resume work with Kunkel. After six years in the Kunkel laboratory, he was recruited by Frank Dixon to join the Scripps Clinic and Research Foundation in La Jolla, where he was appointed to the Cecil H. and Ida M. Green Chair in Medical Research in 1972. After problems at Scripps he returned to Germany, at the Bernhard Nocht Institute for Tropical Medicine.
