= Hans Vogel (scientist) =

Hans Vogel (20 January 1900 – 5 April 1980) was a German scientist known for his work in helminthology (study of parasitic worms). For much of his career he was associated with the Bernhard Nocht Institute for Tropical Medicine in Hamburg.

In the 1930s Vogel described the developmental cycle of Opisthorchis felineus, a trematode known to affect the liver in humans and other mammals. Later in his career he published an article describing the life cycle and aetiology of Echinococcus multilocularis. He is also credited for demonstrating that macaque monkeys can be immunized against Schistosoma japonicum, a parasite that is the cause of Far Eastern schistosomiasis.

From 1963 to 1968, Vogel was director of the Bernhard Nocht Institute. The tapeworm species Echinococcus vogeli is named after him.

== Published works ==
- Vogel H 1934. "Der Entwicklungszyklus von Opistorchis felineus." Far East Assoc Trop Med Nanking 1: 619–624.
- Vogel H, Minning W 1953. "Über die erworbene Resistenz von Macacus rhesus gegenüber Schistosoma japonicum." T. Z Tropenmed Parasit 4: 418–505.
- Vogel H 1955. "Über den Entwicklungszyklus und die Artzugehörigkeit des europäischen Alveolarechinococcus." Dtsch Med Wschr 80: 931–932.
- Vogel H 1957 "Über den Echinococcus multilocularis Süddeutschlands I. Das Bandwurmstadium von Stämmen menschlicher und tierischer Herkunft" (Echinococcus multilocularis in South Germany. I. The tapeworm stage of strains from humans and animals). Z Tropenmed Parasitol. 8: 404–54.
