= Rats, Lice and History =

1935 popular science book by Hans Zinsser

- Cover of the 1963 reprint edition
- Author: Hans Zinsser
- Language: English
- Subject: typhus, history, epidemics
- Genre: popular science
- Publisher: Little, Brown and Company
- Publication date: 1935
- Publication place: United States
- Media type: print
- Pages: 301
- OCLC: 805696791

Rats, Lice and History is a 1935 popular science book by bacteriologist Hans Zinsser on the subject of typhus, a disease on which he performed significant research. He frames the book as a "biography" of typhus, tracing its destructive path since ancient civilizations. He argues that infectious diseases like typhus have had an inordinate but underappreciated impact on the course of human history, as he expresses in this excerpt:

Soldiers have rarely won wars. They more often mop up after the barrage of epidemics. And typhus, with its brothers and sisters—plague, cholera, typhoid, dysentery—has decided more campaigns than Caesar, Hannibal, Napoleon, and the inspectors general of history. The epidemics get the blame for defeat, the generals get the credit for victory. It ought to be the other way around.

This idea was echoed later in works such as Plagues and Peoples and Guns, Germs and Steel.

Written for a lay audience, Rats, Lice and History showcased Zinsser's wry and literate style. The book was well received by readers, reaching the top ten in nonfiction bestsellers, and has gone through multiple editions.

== Summary ==
Early in Rats, Lice and History, Zinsser states his thesis:

Our chief purpose in writing the biography of one of these diseases is to impress the fact that we are dealing with a phase of man's history on earth which has received too little attention from poets, artists, and historians. Swords and lances, arrows, machine guns, and even high explosives have had far less power over the fate of nations than the typhus louse, the plague flea, and the yellow-fever mosquito.

The book is divided into sixteen chapters. As noted in the original subtitle, Being a Study in Biography, Which, After Twelve Preliminary Chapters Indispensable for the Preparation of the Lay Reader, Deals with the Life History of Typhus Fever, the proper "biography" of typhus does not appear until the final four chapters. The first 200 pages provide information in a variety of areas, including:

- Scientific definitions and concepts (e.g., Chapter III: "Leading up to the definition of bacteria and other parasites, and digressing briefly into the question of the origin of life"; Chapter IV: "On parasitism in general, and on the necessity of considering the changing nature of infectious diseases in the historical study of epidemics")
- Diseases of the ancient world (Chapter VI) and their effect on political and military history (Chapters VII and VIII)
- The important vectors of typhus—rats and lice—mentioned in the title, (Chapters IX through XI)

Having received a comprehensive education in liberal arts as well as science and medicine, Zinsser refers throughout to classical works, occasionally quoting passages in Latin, French, and German (without translation). In the text and footnotes, he engages in odd speculations, e.g., would the conquest of the Aztecs have proceeded differently if Cortés brought his wife with him, or what if D. H. Lawrence had painted Lady Chatterley instead of writing about her? The book's discursiveness and droll interactions with the reader (compared by one reviewer to Laurence Sterne's Tristram Shandy) are illustrated in the chapter titles, for instance, "Chapter X: More about the louse: the need for this chapter will be apparent to those who have entered into the spirit of this biography".

== Reception ==
Upon its release, Rats, Lice and History received an overwhelmingly positive reception. In a front-page review in the New York Herald Tribune Books, physician and medical writer Logan Clendening wrote, "It is impossible for me to overpraise this fascinating volume". Thomas Barbour stated in The Atlantic that the book contains "plenty of sound science and medical research, but the lay reader need never fear that he will be either bewildered or bored; he will be enthralled."

In The New York Times Book Review, R. L. Duffus said that "Dr. Zinsser, without being condescending and with no taint of 'popularization,' has written one of the wisest and wittiest books that have come off the presses in many a long month." Duffus added that the author possesses a rare combination of qualities: a deep scientific expertise along with "the energy and the curiosity to master the humanities. Dr. Zinsser's approach is that of a human being looking at humanity and at life in general, and linking his ideas together with the aid of the subject he knows best—namely, the epidemic diseases of mankind. He is never in the least pretentious, but he has the catholicity of a man who has taken all knowledge to be his province."

The New York Times listed Rats, Lice and History as the 8th bestselling nonfiction book of 1935.

Later generations of scientists and physicians, such as Emil Frei and Gerald Weissmann, said that reading Rats, Lice and History in their youth was an inspiration for their scientific careers.
