= Jonas Schmidt-Chanasit =

German virologist

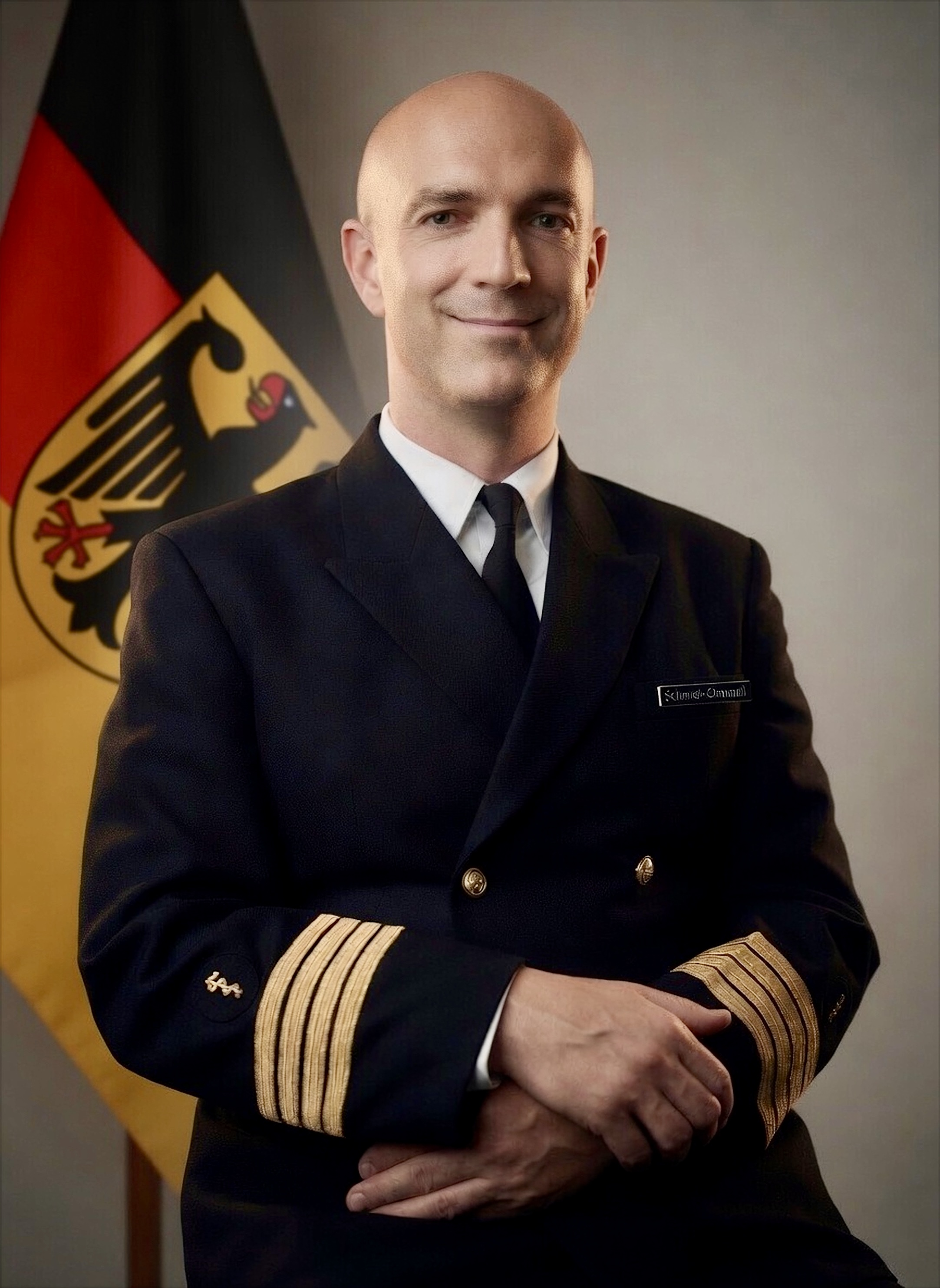
- Portrait of Jonas Schmidt-Chanasit in the uniform of a Flottenarzt 2026
- Born: 25 March 1979; Pankow, Berlin
- Education: Charité Medical School
- Alma mater: Humboldt University
- Known for: Professor of Arbovirology at the University of Hamburg and Deputy Director of the WHO Collaborating Centre for Arbovirus and Haemorrhagic Fever Reference and Research at the Bernhard Nocht Institute for Tropical Medicine
- Children: 2
- Scientific career
- Fields: Virology
- Institutions: University of Hamburg
- Patrons: Hans-Wilhelm Doerr
- Thesis: Development and evaluation of serological assays for the detection of human infections by New World hantaviruses imported to Europe
- Doctoral advisor: Detlev Herbert Krüger

Jonas Schmidt-Chanasit (born 25 March 1979) is a German physician and virologist specialising in arboviruses and emerging zoonotic infections. He is Professor of Arbovirology at the University of Hamburg, heads the Department of Arbovirology and Entomology at the Bernhard Nocht Institute for Tropical Medicine (BNITM), and serves as deputy director of the institute's World Health Organization Collaborating Centre for Arbovirus and Haemorrhagic Fever Reference and Research.

His research focuses on the detection, diagnosis and surveillance of mosquito-borne viruses in Europe, including Usutu virus, West Nile virus and Zika virus, as well as on emerging zoonotic pathogens. He became widely known in Germany as a scientific commentator during major infectious-disease outbreaks, particularly the COVID-19 pandemic.

Schmidt-Chanasit is married, father of a son and a daughter and lives with his family in Berlin and Bangkok.

== Education and career ==
Schmidt-Chanasit was born in Pankow, East Berlin. He studied medicine at the Charité in Berlin from 2000 to 2006 and completed his medical doctorate in 2006 with a thesis on hantavirus diagnostics. During his doctoral research, he was a visiting researcher at Kasetsart University in Bangkok. He subsequently conducted postdoctoral research under virologist Hans-Wilhelm Doerr at Goethe University Frankfurt and completed his habilitation in virology in 2010.

Since 2010, he has been part of the leadership of the WHO Collaborating Centre for Arbovirus and Haemorrhagic Fever Reference and Research at the Bernhard Nocht Institute for Tropical Medicine. In 2018, he was appointed to a W3 professorship in arbovirology at the University of Hamburg.

== Research and public-health work ==
Schmidt-Chanasit's research has concentrated on arbovirus diagnostics, virus–mosquito interactions and the surveillance of emerging infections. In 2010, a BNITM team involving Schmidt-Chanasit reported the first detection of Sindbis virus in Germany.

In 2011, Schmidt-Chanasit and colleagues reported the first isolation of Usutu virus in Germany. The virus subsequently became an important subject of surveillance because of its effects on wild birds and its potential to cause neurological disease in humans.

In 2014, he co-authored the report of the first laboratory-confirmed Zika virus infection imported into Europe. He later contributed to an international study evaluating and optimising molecular assays for Zika virus detection.

Schmidt-Chanasit was also part of the interdisciplinary team that identified variegated squirrel bornavirus 1, a previously unknown zoonotic bornavirus associated with fatal encephalitis in three German breeders of exotic squirrels.

In 2019, virus diagnostics at BNITM, which Schmidt-Chanasit headed, contributed to confirming Germany's first locally acquired human West Nile virus infections. The infections occurred as part of the first documented West Nile virus epidemic in Germany.

His department was a partner in the Early Warning System for Mosquito-Borne Diseases (EYWA), a European research consortium combining epidemiological, entomological and environmental data. The project received the European Commission's €5 million EIC Horizon Prize for Early Warning for Epidemics in 2022.

== Public communication ==
Schmidt-Chanasit became a frequent scientific commentator in Germany during major infectious-disease outbreaks. During the COVID-19 pandemic, Die Zeit described him in 2021 as one of the most important voices in Germany's response to the pandemic, while noting that some of his positions were controversial.

A 2020 profile highlighted his view that virology alone was insufficient for managing the crisis and reported that he advised both policymakers and groups directly affected by public-health restrictions.

== Other roles ==
Schmidt-Chanasit serves as a reserve medical officer in the Bundeswehr Joint Medical Service with the naval rank of Flottenarzt, equivalent to captain (OF-5).

== Honours ==
- 2014 – Science Award in Clinical Virology, jointly awarded by the German Association for the Control of Viral Diseases (DVV) and the German Society for Virology (GfV).
