= William Hammon =

American physician and researcher

William McDowell Hammon
- Born: July 4, 1904; Columbus, Ohio
- Died: September 19, 1989 (aged 85); Seminole, Florida
- Education: Allegheny College; Harvard Medical School
- Known for: Polio vaccine pioneer, Tropical diseases
- Scientific career
- Fields: Physician, virologist, and epidemiologist
- Workplaces: University of California, Berkeley; University of Pittsburgh
- Doctoral advisor: Hans Zinsser

William McDowell Hammon (July 4, 1904 – September 19, 1989) was an American physician and researcher, best known for his work on poliomyelitis. In his early twenties and prior to becoming a research physician, Hammon worked for four years as a medical missionary in the former Belgian Congo. After returning, he received his undergraduate degree from Allegheny College in 1932. Completing his medical training at Harvard Medical School in 1936, Hammon then studied with the bacteriologist Hans Zinsser, receiving a Master of Public Health degree in 1938, and a Doctor of Philosophy degree in 1939. During this period Hammon co-discovered the first vaccine for feline panleucopenia.

Hammon was presented with the Medal of Freedom in 1946 by President Harry Truman. In 1949 Harmon was elected president of the American Society for Microbiology.
