= Ludwig Halberstädter =

Physician, co-discoverer of etiology of trachoma (1876–1949)

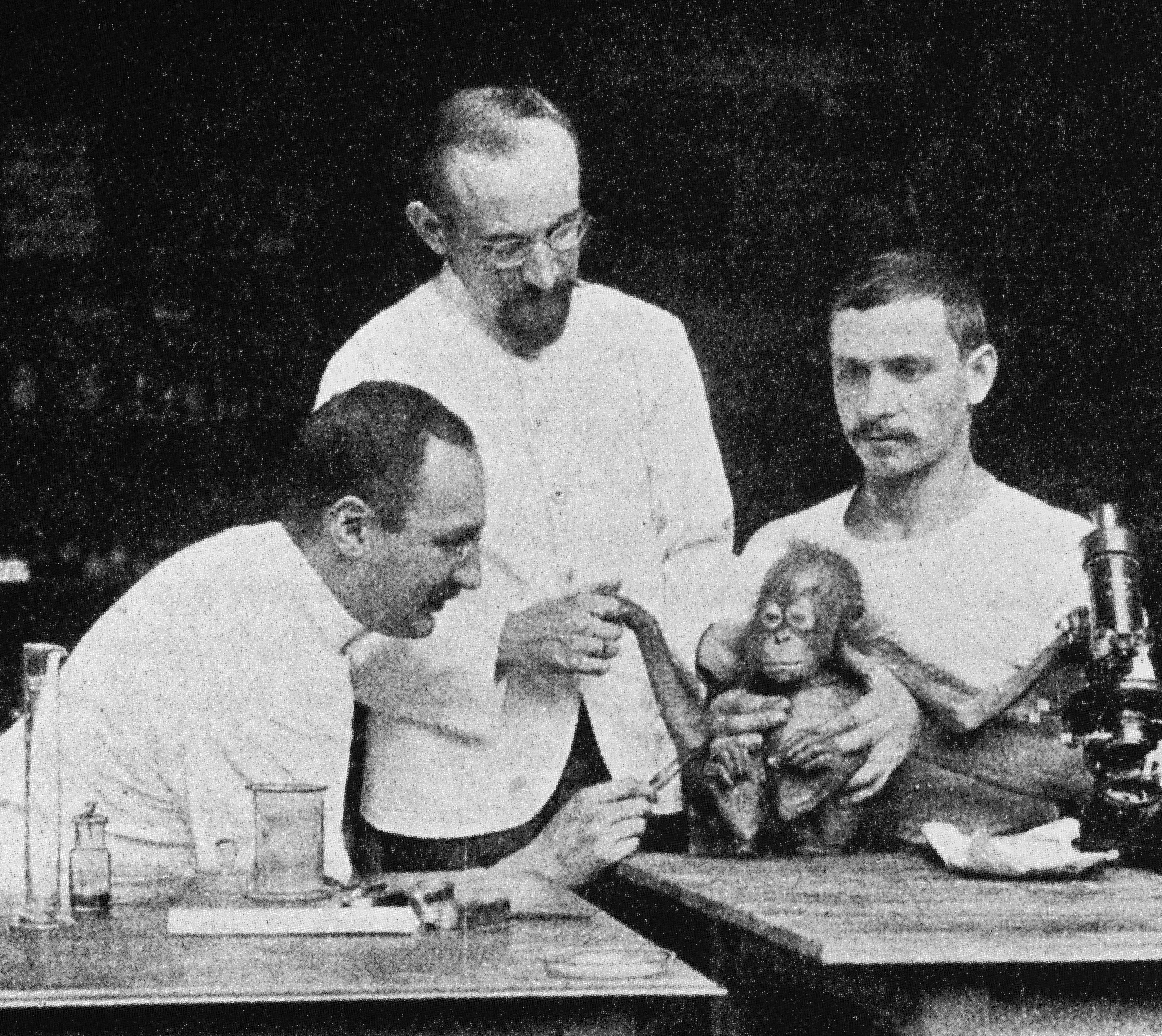
Ludwig Halberstädter (left) and Stanislaus von Prowazek (center) conduct an experiment on a man holding an orangutan during their research into cytoplasmic inclusion bodies of trachoma c. 1907.

Ludwig Halberstädter (9 December 1876, in Beuthen, Oberschlesien – 20 August 1949) was a German-Israeli dermatologist and radiologist.

In 1901 he obtained his medical doctorate from the University of Breslau, and following graduation became an assistant to surgeon Carl Garré (1857–1928) at the University of Königsberg. Afterwards he returned to Breslau as an assistant to dermatologist Albert Neisser (1855–1916), under whose direction he participated on a medical research mission to Java (1907).

In 1922 he obtained his habilitation for dermatology and radiation therapy in Berlin. Here he became director of the radiation department at the Instituts für Krebsforschung (Institute for Cancer Research), Berlin-Dahlem. In this capacity he used thorium as a treatment for cancer. In 1933 he emigrated from Nazi Germany to Palestine, where he became director of radiation therapy at the Hadassah Hospital in Jerusalem. He died in New York City on August 20, 1949.

In 1905 he introduced radiation for ablation of the ovaries.

== Associated eponym ==
- "Halberstädter-Prowazek bodies": Cytoplasmic inclusion bodies located near the nuclei of conjunctival epithelial cells in trachoma. Named with co-discoverer, bacteriologist Stanislaus von Prowazek (1875–1915).

== Publications ==
- Die Folgen der Unterbindung der vena femoralis unterhalb des Ligamentum Poupartii, 1903
- Über Zelleinschlüsse parasitärer Natur beim Trachom. Arbeiten aus dem Kaiserlichen Gesundheitsamte, Berlin, 1907, 26: 44–47; with Stanislaus von Prowazek.
- Zur Aetiologie des Trachoms. Deutsche medizinische Wochenschrift, August 1907, 33: 1285.1287; with Stanislaus von Prowazek.
- Mikrobiologische Grundlagen der Strahlentherapie. In Handbuch der gesamten Strahlenheilkunde. Volume I. Munich, 1928.
- Allgemein biologische und schädigende wirkungen der Röntgenstrahlen. In Handbuch der Hautkrankheiten. Volume 5, 2. Berlin, 1929.
