= Rickettsia prowazekii =

Scientific classification
- Domain: Bacteria
- Kingdom: Pseudomonadati
- Phylum: Pseudomonadota
- Class: Alphaproteobacteria
- Order: Rickettsiales
- Family: Rickettsiaceae
- Genus: Rickettsia
- Species group: Typhus group
- Species: R. prowazekii

Binomial name
- Rickettsia prowazekii da Rocha-Lima, 1916

Species of bacterium

Rickettsia prowazekii is a species of gram-negative, obligate intracellular parasitic, aerobic bacilliform bacteria of class Alphaproteobacteria that is the etiologic agent of epidemic typhus, transmitted in the feces of lice. In North America, the main reservoir for R. prowazekii is the flying squirrel. R. prowazekii is often surrounded by a protein microcapsular layer and slime layer; the natural life cycle of the bacterium generally involves a vertebrate and an invertebrate host, usually an arthropod, typically the human body louse. A form of R. prowazekii that exists in the feces of arthropods remains stably infective for months. R. prowazekii also appears to be the closest semi-free-living relative of mitochondria, based on genome sequencing.

== History ==
=== Discovery ===
Henrique da Rocha Lima, a Brazilian doctor, discovered this bacterium in 1916. He named it after his colleague Stanislaus von Prowazek, who had died from typhus in 1915. Both Prowazek and Rocha Lima had been infected with typhus while studying its causative agent in a prisoner-of-war camp hospital in Cottbus, Germany. This bacterium lacks flagella and is aerobic. It is classed gram-negative because its cell walls do not retain crystal violet Gram stain; gram-negative bacteria in general are more resistant to many antibiotics such as penicillin.

== Genome ==
The genome of R. prowazekii is reduced, being about 1Mb in size and encoding 834 proteins. Some strains encode 866 proteins. They do not encode all the proteins required to live on their own. Missing activities have to be provided by its host, a eukaryotic cell. For this reason, R. prowazekii has sometimes been regarded as a model for the intracellular bacterial ancestor of mitochondria.

== Treatment ==
Vaccines against R. prowazekii were developed in the 1940s, and were highly effective in reducing typhus deaths among U.S. soldiers during World War II. Immunity following recovery from infection with, or by immunization against, R. prowazekii is lifelong in most cases. However, R. prowazekii can establish a latent infection, which can reactivate after years or decades (referred to as Brill-Zinsser disease). Treatment with tetracycline antibiotics is usually successful.
