= Typhus =

Group of infectious diseases

- Other names: Typhus fever
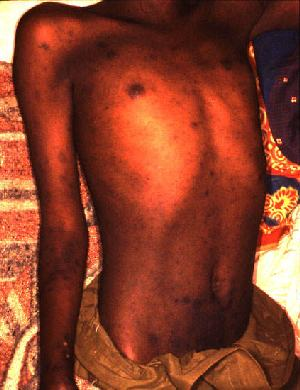
- Rash caused by epidemic typhus
- Specialty: Infectious disease
- Symptoms: Fever, headache, rash
- Complications: Meningoencephalitis
- Usual onset: 1–2 weeks after exposure
- Types: Epidemic typhus, Scrub typhus, Murine typhus
- Causes: Bacterial infection spread by parasites such as Rickettsia prowazekii (ET), Orientia tsutsugamushi (ST), and Rickettsia typhi (MT).
- Risk factors: Poor sanitation
- Prevention: Avoiding exposure to organisms known to carry the disease
- Treatment: Doxycycline
- Frequency: Rare

Typhus, also known as typhus fever, is a group of infectious diseases that include epidemic typhus, scrub typhus, and murine typhus. Common symptoms such as fever, headache, and a rash typically begin one to two weeks after exposure.

The diseases are caused by specific types of bacterial infection. Epidemic typhus is caused by Rickettsia prowazekii spread by body lice, scrub typhus is caused by Orientia tsutsugamushi spread by chiggers, and murine typhus is caused by Rickettsia typhi spread by fleas.

Vaccines have been developed, but none are commercially available. Prevention is achieved by reducing exposure to the organisms that spread the disease. Treatment is with the antibiotic doxycycline. Epidemic typhus generally occurs in outbreaks when poor sanitary conditions and crowding are present. While once common, it is now rare. Scrub typhus occurs in Southeast Asia, Japan, and northern Australia. Murine typhus occurs in tropical and subtropical areas of the world.

Typhus has been described since at least 1528. The name comes from the Greek tûphos (τῦφος), meaning 'hazy' or 'smoky' and commonly used as a word for delusion, describing the state of mind of those infected. While typhoid means 'typhus-like', typhus and typhoid fever are distinct diseases caused by different types of bacteria, the latter by specific strains of Salmonella typhi. However, in some languages such as German, the term typhus does mean 'typhoid fever', and the here-described typhus is called by another name, such as the language's equivalent of 'spotted fever'.

== Signs and symptoms ==
These signs and symptoms refer to epidemic typhus, as it is the most severe of the typhus group of diseases.

Signs and symptoms begin with sudden onset of fever and other flu-like symptoms about one to two weeks after being infected. Five to nine days after the symptoms have started, a rash typically begins on the trunk and spreads to the extremities. This rash eventually spreads over most of the body, sparing the face, palms, and soles. Signs of meningoencephalitis begin with the rash and continue into the second or third weeks. Other signs of meningoencephalitis include sensitivity to light (photophobia), altered mental status (delirium), or coma. Untreated cases are often fatal.

Signs of scrub typhus usually start within 1 to 2 weeks after being infected. These symptoms include fever, headaches, chills, swollen lymph nodes, nausea/vomiting, and a rash at the site of infection called an eschar. More severe symptoms may damage the lungs, brain, kidney, meninges, and heart.

== Causes ==
Multiple diseases include the word "typhus" in their descriptions. Types include:

Condition	Bacterium	Reservoir/vector	Notes
Epidemic louse-borne typhus	Rickettsia prowazekii	Body louse	When the term "typhus" is used without qualification, this is usually the condition described. Historical references to "typhus" are now generally considered to be this condition.
Murine typhus or "endemic typhus"	Rickettsia typhi	Fleas on rats	
Scrub typhus	Orientia tsutsugamushi	Harvest mites on humans or rodents	
Spotted fever	Rickettsia spotted fever group	Ticks	Includes Boutonneuse fever, Rocky Mountain spotted fever, Queensland tick typhus and other variants.

== Diagnosis ==
The main method of diagnosing typhus of all types is laboratory testing. It is most commonly done with an indirect immunofluorescence antibody IFA test for all types of typhus. This tests a sample for the antibodies associated with typhus. It can also be done with either immunohistochemistry (IHC) or polymerase chain reaction (PCR) tests excluding scrub typhus. Scrub typhus is not tested with IHC or PCR but is instead tested with the IFA test as well as indirect immunuoperoxidase (IIP) assays.

== Prevention ==
As of 2025, no vaccine is commercially available. A vaccine has been in development for scrub typhus known as the scrub typhus vaccine.

=== Scrub typhus ===
Scrub typhus is caused by mites, so avoiding the outdoors when scrub is common in the area is advised. Making sure clothing is treated with permethrin to prevent mite bites, and use of insect repellent is recommended to keep mites away. It is also advised to dress children and babies in clothing that covers their limbs, and to put a mosquito cover over babies in a stroller.

=== Epidemic typhus ===
Epidemic typhus is caused by body lice, which thrives in areas where overcrowding is prominent. It is best to avoid highly populated areas. To help kill the lice, make sure to regularly clean yourself and your clothing, including bedding and towels and avoid sharing any fabric items with anyone who has lice or typhus. Treating clothing with permethrin can help in kill lice.

=== Murine typhus ===
Murine typhus is caused by flea bites, which can be avoided by making sure pets do not have fleas. If they do, they should be treated, and avoided. One should also avoid contact with wild animals, use insect repellent to keep fleas away, and wear gloves when dealing with sick or dead animals. Taking steps to ensure rodents or other wildlife do not get into one's home is also recommended.

== Treatment ==
The American Public Health Association recommends treatment based upon clinical findings and before culturing confirms the diagnosis. Without treatment, death may occur in 10% to 60% of people with epidemic typhus, with people over age 50 having the highest risk of death. In the antibiotic era, death is uncommon if doxycycline is given. In one study of 60 people hospitalized with epidemic typhus, no one died when given doxycycline or chloramphenicol.

== Epidemiology ==
According to the World Health Organization, in 2010 the death rate from typhus was about one of every 5,000,000 people per year.

Only a few areas of epidemic typhus exist today. Since the late 20th century, cases have been reported in Burundi, Rwanda, Ethiopia, Algeria, and a few areas in South and Central America.

Except for two cases, all instances of epidemic typhus in the United States have occurred east of the Mississippi River. An examination of a cluster of cases in Pennsylvania concluded the source of the infection was flying squirrels. Sylvatic cycle (diseases transmitted from wild animals) epidemic typhus remains uncommon in the US. The Centers for Disease Control and Prevention have documented only 47 cases from 1976 to 2010. An outbreak of flea-borne murine typhus was identified in downtown Los Angeles, California, in October 2018.

== History ==
=== Middle Ages ===
The first reliable description of typhus appears in 1489 during the Catholic Monarchs of Spain's siege of Baza against the Emirate of Granada] during the War of Granada (1482–1492). These accounts include descriptions of fever; red spots over arms, back, and chest; attention deficit, progressing to delirium; and gangrenous sores and the associated smell of rotting flesh. During the siege, the Spaniards lost 3,000 men to enemy action, but an additional 17,000 died of typhus.

In historical times, "jail fever" or "gaol fever" was common in English prisons, and is believed by modern authorities to have been typhus. It often occurred when prisoners were crowded together into dark, filthy rooms where lice spread easily. Thus, "imprisonment until the next term of court" was often equivalent to a death sentence. Prisoners brought before the court sometimes infected members of the court. The Black Assize of Exeter 1586 was another notable outbreak. During the Lent assizes court held at Taunton in 1730, gaol fever caused the death of the Lord Chief Baron, as well as the High Sheriff, the sergeant, and hundreds of others. During a time when persons were executed for capital offences, more prisoners died from 'gaol fever' than were put to death by all the public executioners in the British realm. In 1759, an English authority estimated that each year, a quarter of the prisoners had died from gaol fever. In London, gaol fever frequently broke out among the ill-kept prisoners of Newgate Prison and then moved into the general city population. In May 1750, the Lord Mayor of London, Sir Samuel Pennant, and many court personnel were fatally infected in the courtroom of the Old Bailey, which adjoined Newgate Prison.

=== Early modern epidemics ===
Epidemics occurred routinely throughout Europe from the 16th to the 19th centuries, including during the English Civil War, the Thirty Years' War, and the Napoleonic Wars. Pestilence of several kinds raged among combatants and civilians in Germany and surrounding lands from 1618 to 1648. According to Joseph Patrick Byrne, "By war's end, typhus may have killed more than 10 percent of the total German population, and disease in general accounted for 90 percent of Europe's casualties."

=== 19th century ===
During Napoleon's invasion of Russia in 1812, more French soldiers died of typhus and dysentery than were killed by the Russians.

A major epidemic occurred in Ireland between 1816 and 1819, during the famine caused by a worldwide reduction in temperature known as the Year Without a Summer. An estimated 100,000 people perished. Typhus appeared again in the late 1830s, and yet another major typhus epidemic occurred during the Great Irish Famine between 1846 and 1849. The typhus outbreak along with typhoid fever is said to be responsible for 400,000 deaths. The Irish typhus spread to England, where it was sometimes called "Irish fever" and was noted for its virulence. It killed people of all social classes, as lice were endemic and inescapable, but it hit particularly hard in the lower or "unwashed" social strata.

In the United States, a typhus epidemic broke out in Philadelphia in 1837 and killed the son of Franklin Pierce (14th President of the United States) in Concord, New Hampshire, in 1843. Several epidemics occurred in Baltimore, Memphis, and Washington, DC, between 1865 and 1873. Typhus was also a significant killer during the US Civil War, although typhoid fever was the more prevalent cause of US Civil War "camp fever". Typhoid fever is caused by the bacterium Salmonella enterica Serovar Typhi.

In Canada alone, the typhus epidemic of 1847 killed more than 20,000 people from 1847 to 1848, mainly Irish immigrants in fever sheds and other forms of quarantine, who had contracted the disease aboard the crowded coffin ships in fleeing the Great Irish Famine. Officials neither knew how to provide sufficient sanitation under conditions of the time nor understood how the disease spread.

=== 20th century ===
Typhus was endemic in Poland and several neighboring countries prior to World War I (1914–1918), but became epidemic during the war. Delousing stations were established for troops on the Western Front during World War I, including the use of shower trains, but typhus ravaged the armies of the Eastern Front, where over 150,000 died in Serbia alone. Fatalities were generally between 10% and 40% of those infected and the disease was a major cause of death for those nursing the sick.

In 1922, the typhus epidemic reached its peak in Soviet territory, with some 20 to 30 million cases in Russia. Although typhus had ravaged Poland with some 4 million cases reported, efforts to stem the spread of disease in that country had largely succeeded by 1921 through the efforts of public health pioneers such as Hélène Sparrow and Rudolf Weigl. In Russia during the civil war between the White and Red Armies, epidemic typhus killed 2–3 million people, many of whom were civilians. In 1937 and 1938, there was a typhus epidemic in Chile. On 6 March 1939, Prime Minister of France Édouard Daladier stated to the French parliament, he would return 300,000 of the Spanish refugees fleeing from the 1938 Spanish Civil War; reasons included the typhus spread in the French refugee camps, as well as France's sovereign recognition of Francisco Franco.

During World War II, many German POWs after the loss at Stalingrad died of typhus. Typhus epidemics killed those confined to POW camps, ghettos, and Nazi concentration camps who were held in unhygienic conditions. Pictures of mass graves including people who died from typhus can be seen in footage shot at Bergen-Belsen concentration camp. Among thousands of prisoners in concentration camps such as Theresienstadt and Bergen-Belsen who died of typhus were Anne Frank, age 15, and her sister Margot, age 19, in the latter camp.

The first typhus vaccine was developed by the Polish zoologist Rudolf Weigl in the interwar period; the vaccine did not prevent the disease but reduced its mortality.

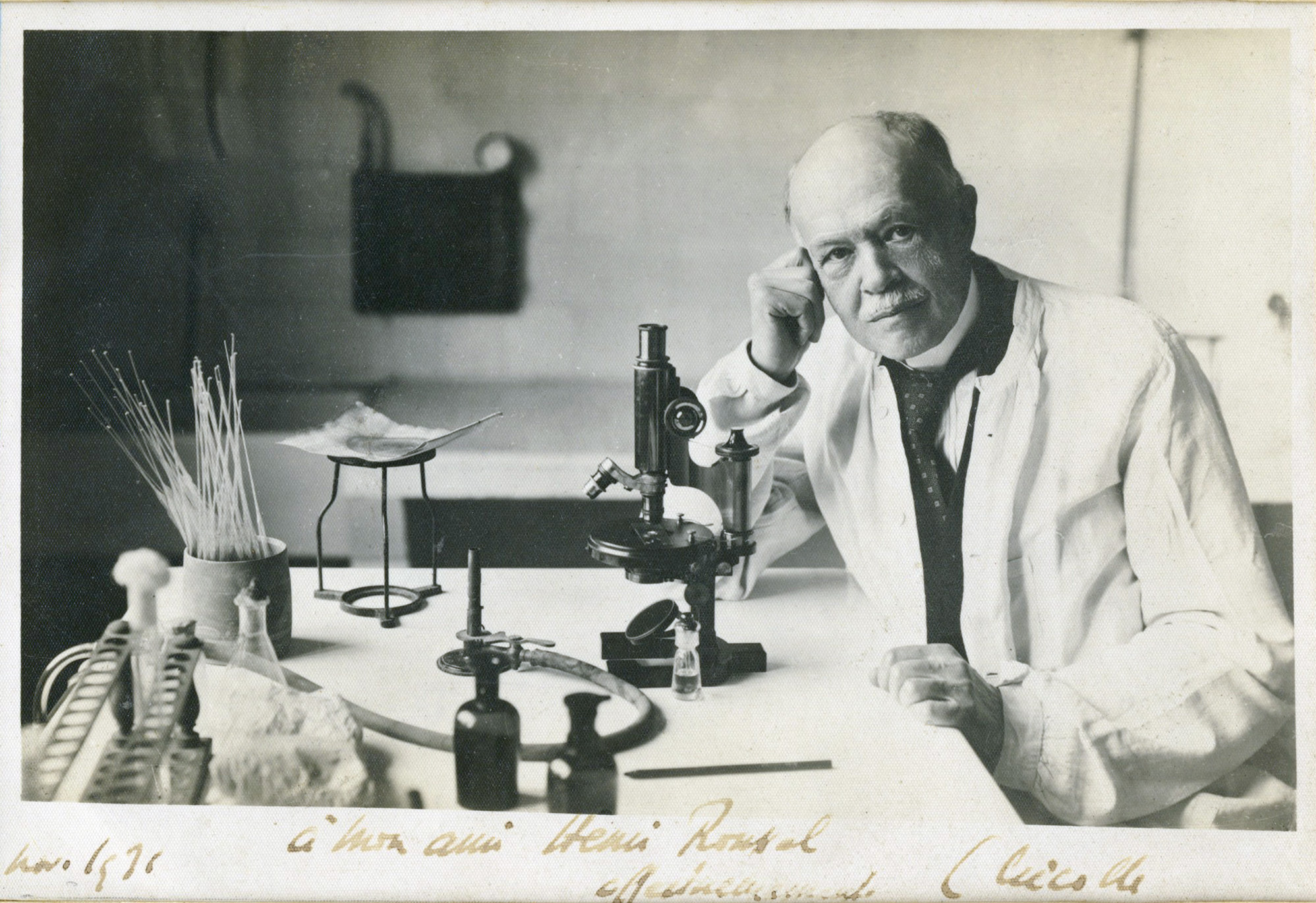
Charles Nicolle received the 1928 Nobel Prize in Medicine for his identification of lice as the transmitter of epidemic typhus.

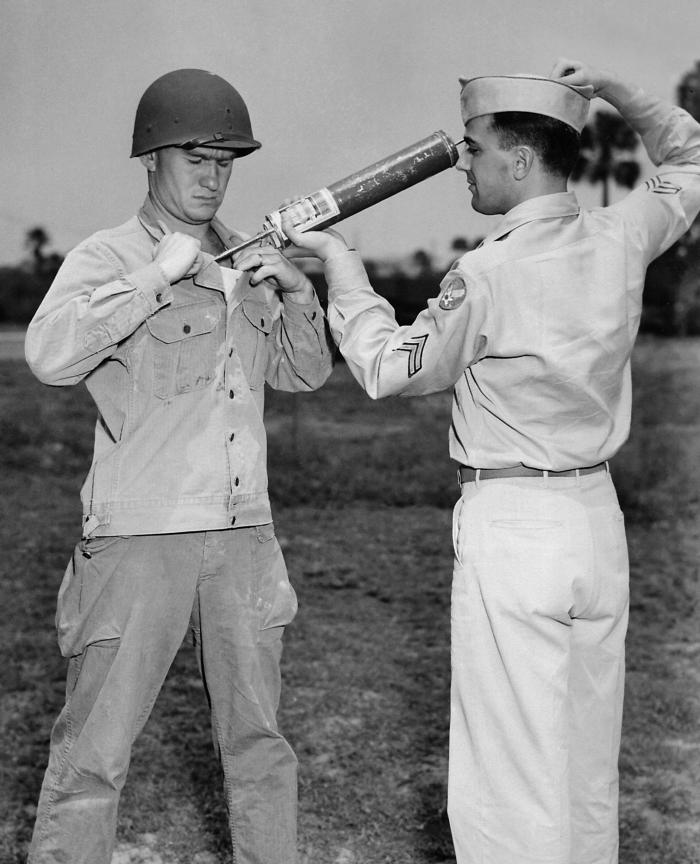
A US soldier is demonstrating DDT hand-spraying equipment. DDT was used to control the spread of typhus-carrying lice.

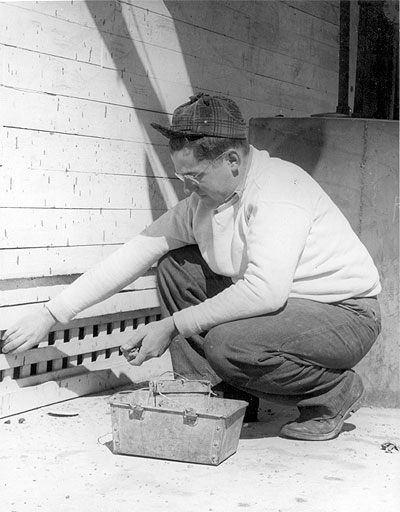
A Civilian Public Service worker distributes rat poison for typhus control in Gulfport, Mississippi, around 1945.

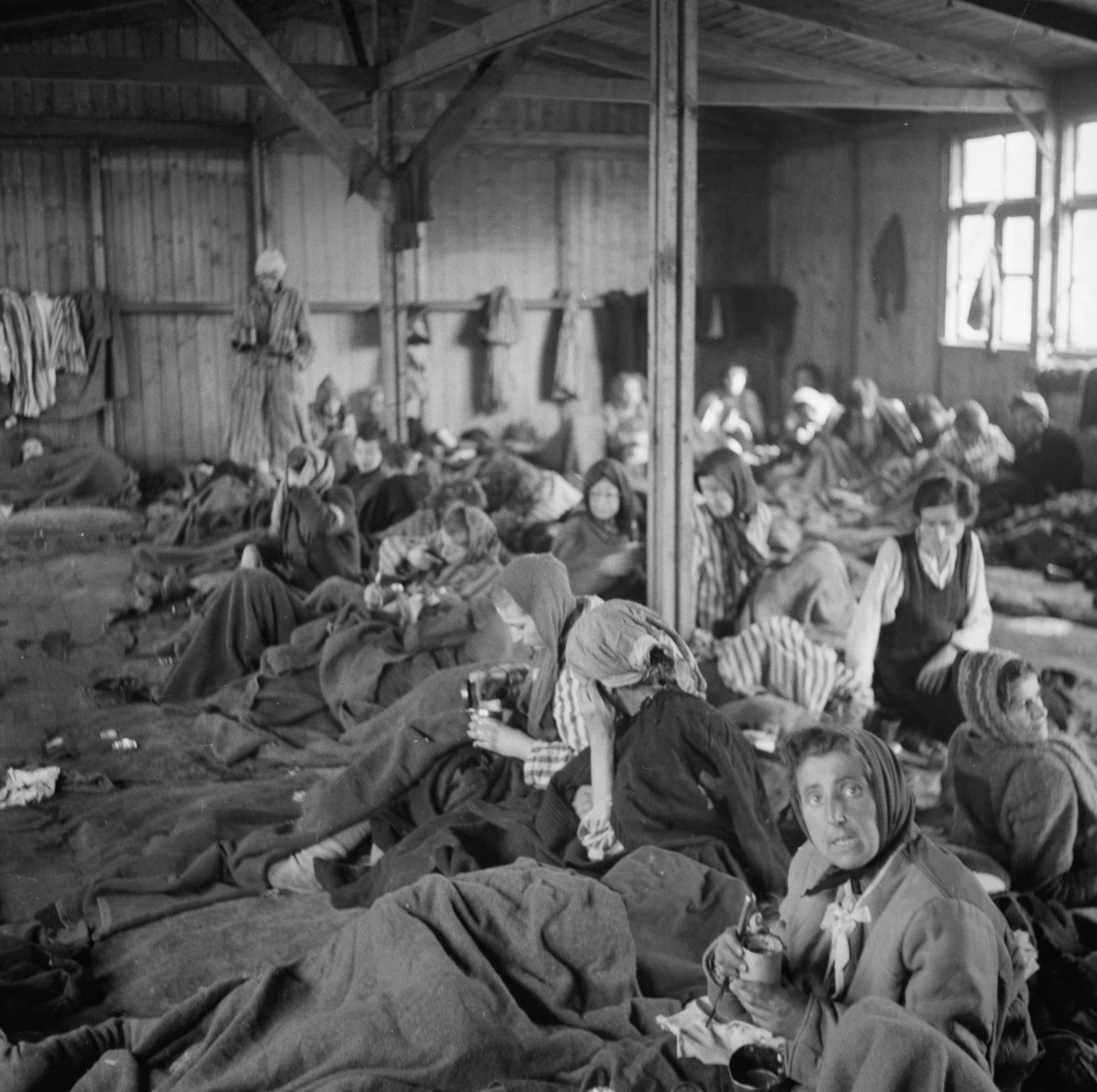
Women suffering from Typhus at Bergen-Belsen concentration camp, shortly after liberation. Typhus rapidly spread in the unhygenic, crowded conditions of concentration camps.

=== 21st century ===
In 2018, a murine typhus outbreak spread through Los Angeles County, primarily affecting homeless people. In 2019, city attorney Elizabeth Greenwood revealed that she was infected with typhus from a flea bite at her office in Los Angeles City Hall. Pasadena also experienced a sudden uptick in typhus with 22 cases in 2018 but, without being able to attribute this to one location, the Pasadena Public Health Department did not identify the cases as an "outbreak". Over the past decade as well murine typhus cases have been rising with 271 cases in 2022. In 2025, there were 220 cases documented, which is a rise from 187 cases in 2024.
