= Merosome =

A merosome is a life stage of malaria parasites of the genus Plasmodium. After injection by mosquitoes into the human host, malaria parasites first migrate to liver cells (hepatocytes), where they replicate asexually inside the host cell. Afterwards, they go on to infect red blood cells. This transition is characterised by the 'budding off' of membrane-bound structures called merosomes, first characterised by Sturm and Amino et al. in 2006. It is thought that these structures, that are derived from hepatocytes including their membranes, aid in the parasites' evasion of immune cells known as Kupffer cells that are located in the liver.
