= Hermann Dürck =

German pathologist and histologist

Hermann Ludwig Friedrich Franz Dürck
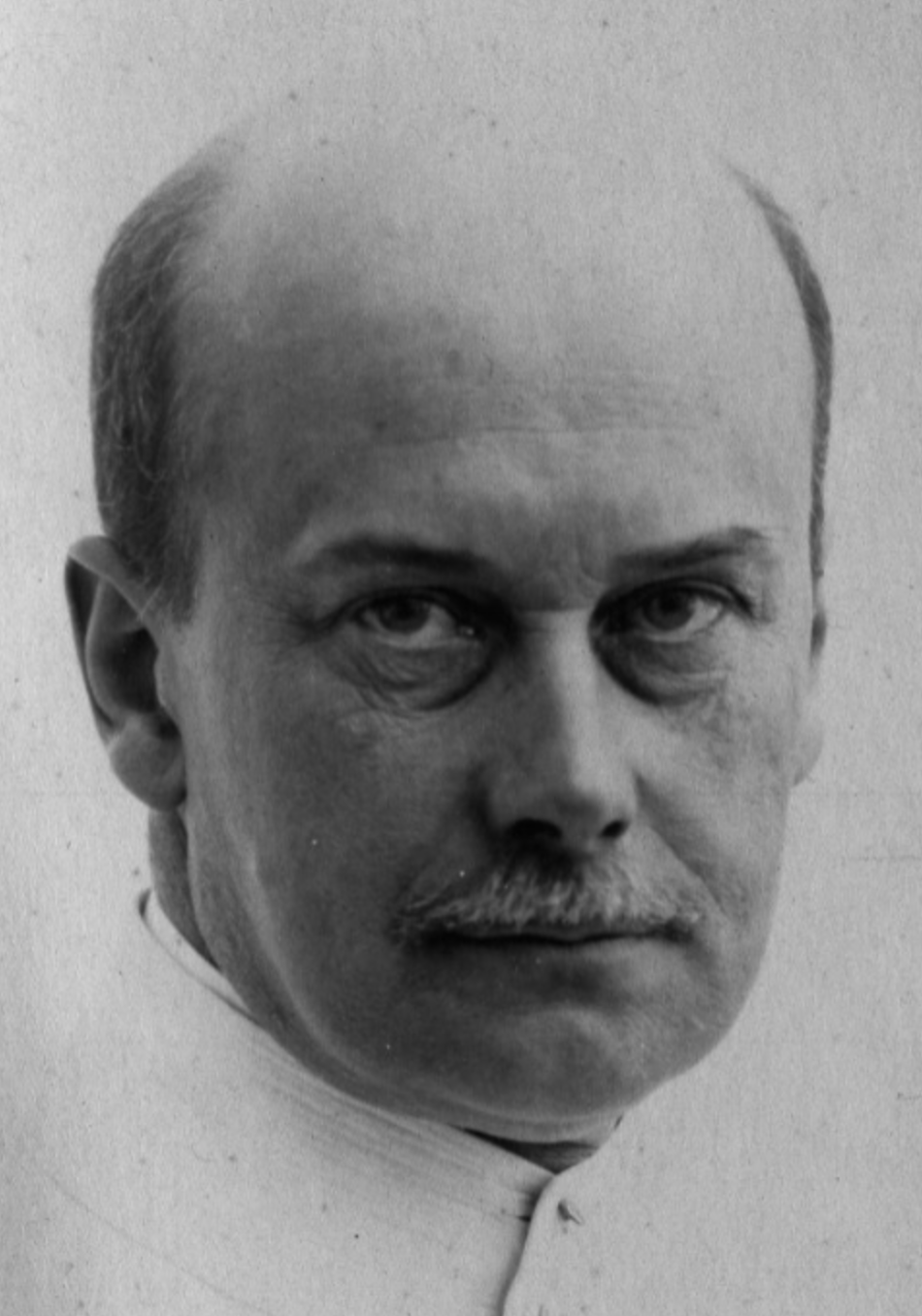
- Born: November 2, 1869; Munich, Kingdom of Bavaria
- Died: January 9, 1941 (aged 71)
- Scientific career
- Fields: Pathology; histology
- Institutions: Ludwig-Maximilians-Universität München; University of Jena

Hermann Ludwig Friedrich Franz Dürck (2 November 1869, Munich – 9 January 1941, Munich) was a German pathologist and histologist.

He studied under Otto Bollinger at the Ludwig-Maximilians-Universität München (LMU) and with Hans Chiari at Prague, obtaining his doctorate at LMU in 1892. In 1897, he received his habilitation in pathological anatomy and bacteriology, attaining the title of associate professor in 1902. In 1909, he relocated to the institute of pathology in Jena as a full professor, followed by a directorship at the pathological institute at the Rechts der Isar Hospital in Munich (from 1911). In 1919, he became an honorary professor at LMU.

His wide-ranging research included investigations of beriberi, malaria, the pathological anatomy of the plague, as well as studies involving the etiology and histology of pneumonia. His name is associated with "Dürck nodes", described as perivascular chronic inflammatory infiltrates in the brain, associated with human trypanosomiasis.

== Publications ==
Dürck was the author of Atlas und Grundriss der speziellen pathologischen Histologie, later translated and published in English as:

- "Atlas and epitome of special pathologic histology. Circulatory organs, respiratory organs, gastrointestinal tract", 1900.
- "Atlas and epitome of special pathologic histology, Liver; urinary organs; sexual organs; nervous system; skin; muscles; bones", 1901.

He also wrote Atlas und Grundriss der allgemeinen pathologischen Histologie, translated and published in English as "Atlas and epitome of general pathologic histology" (1904).
