= Peter Szatmari (geologist) =

- Born: Budapest, Hungary
- Citizenship: Brazilian
- Education: University of Edinburgh
- Known for: Study of evaporites, Petroleum formation by Fischer-Tropsch Synthesis
- Scientific career
- Fields: Geology, Tectonics, Geochemistry, Geochronology
- Workplaces: Eötvös Loránd University, University of Edinburgh, Princeton University, Lamont–Doherty Earth Observatory, Petrobras

Peter Szatmari is a geologist born in Budapest, Hungary, where he graduated in geology at the Eötvös Loránd University. He obtained his PhD from the University of Edinburgh on salt (evaporites) and performed post-doctoral research at Princeton University. He also worked at the Lamont–Doherty Earth Observatory, during the early days of plate tectonics theory.

Since 1973 Szatmari has worked in Brazil, initially as a consultant to Petrobras. He has taught courses and led work teams that have made important discoveries of deposits of potassium salts and oil in the Sergipe-Alagoas and Amazonas basins. Since 1980, he has been a member of the research staff of the Research Center of Petrobras, CENPES, in Rio de Janeiro. In addition to coordinating various study groups, he has taught courses in structural geology, tectonics, and tectonic geology of salt (evaporites).

Szatmari has published over 200 works, including articles in scientific journals, monographs and technical reports, and jointly edited the book Salt - Geology and Tectonics. One of Szatmari's most important contributions is on the formation of oil via catalytic reactions of the Fischer-Tropsch type, as serpentization of mantle's peridotites. He also performed studies on the distribution of metals present in petroleum, comparing them with the mantle rocks, chondrites, crust, and seawater.

His recent research work, with others at Petrobras and its private partners (British Gas BG, Repsol of Spain and GALP of Portugal), on the oil deposites deep beneath the salt layer in the Santos Basin (the continental crust extending about 700 kilometers offshore in the region of the São Paulo) has been mentioned in the Brazilian national press.

In 2009, he was the honorary president, of the VI International Symposium on Tectonics. In 2012 received the Prize Gold Medal “José Bonifácio de Andrada e Silva” from Brazilian Geological Society in honour to geoscientists who have contributed to the development and advancement of geological knowledge by research and scientific leadership.
