= Federal University of Rio de Janeiro =

Public university in Rio de Janeiro, Brazil

- Universidade Federal do Rio de Janeiro
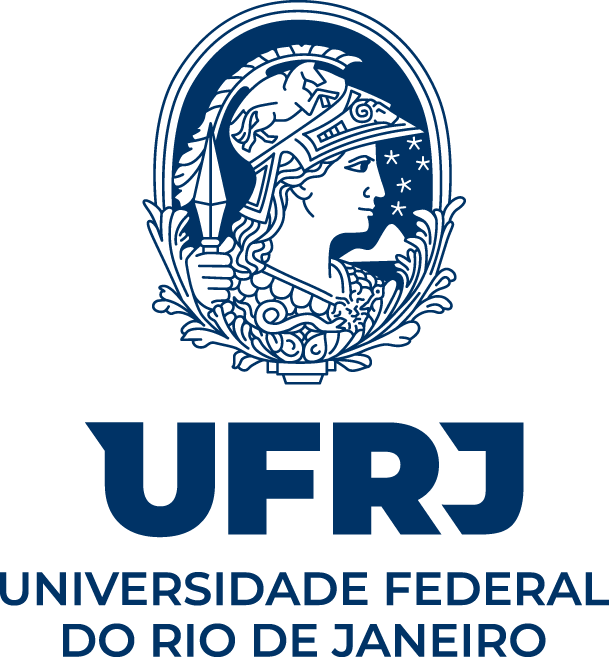
- Other name: UFRJ
- Motto: A Universidade do Brasil
- Motto in English: "The University of Brazil"
- Type: Public research university
- Established: December 16, 1792 (233 years) (Royal Academy); September 7, 1920 (106 years) (University)
- Budget: R$3.8 billion (2020)
- Rector: Roberto de Andrade Medronho
- Academic staff: 4,218 (2021)
- Administrative staff: 9,153 (2021)
- Students: 69,200 (2021)
- Undergraduates: 53,500 (2021)
- Postgraduates: 15,700 (2021)
- Location: Rio de Janeiro, Rio de Janeiro, Brazil; 22°51′45″S 43°13′26″W
- Campus: University town 2,338 acres (946 ha) (Main campus) 3 municipalities; Rio de Janeiro; Duque de Caxias; Macaé
- Colors: Yellow and White
- Mascot: Minerva
- Website: ufrj.br/en/
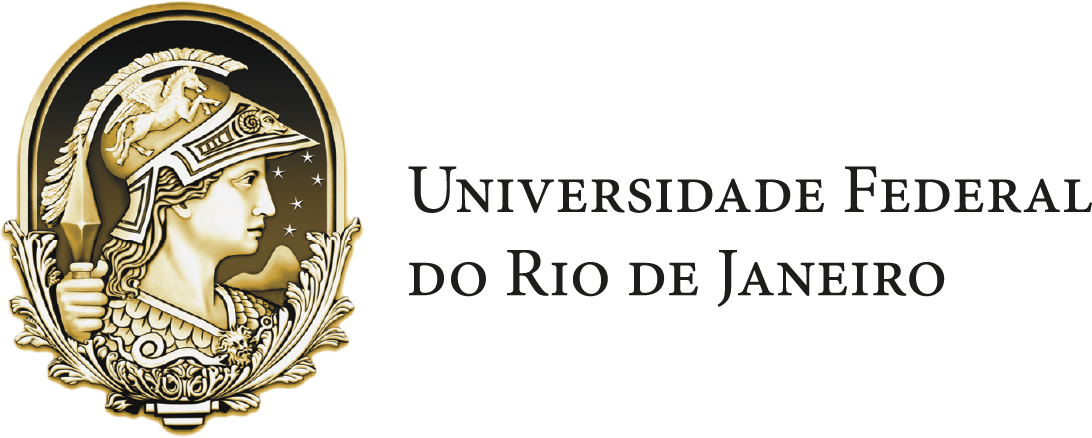

The Federal University of Rio de Janeiro (Portuguese: Universidade Federal do Rio de Janeiro, UFRJ) (Note: Alternatively known as University of Brazil (Portuguese: Universidade do Brasil).) is a public research university in Rio de Janeiro, Brazil. It is the largest federal university in the country and one of Brazil's centers of excellence in teaching and research.

The university is located mainly in Rio de Janeiro, with satellites spreading to ten other cities. It is Brazil's first official higher education institution, and has operated continuously since 1792, when the "Real Academia de Artilharia, Fortificação e Desenho" (Royal Academy of Artillery, Fortification and Design, precursor to the university's current Polytechnic School) was founded, and served as basis for the country's college system since its officialization in 1920. Besides its 157 undergraduate and 580 postgraduate courses, UFRJ is responsible for seven museums – most notably the National Museum of Brazil –, nine hospitals, hundreds of laboratories and research facilities and forty-three libraries. Its history and identity are closely tied to the Brazilian ambitions of forging a modern, competitive and just society.

Former alumni include renowned economists Carlos Lessa and Mário Henrique Simonsen; Minister Marco Aurélio Mello; the architect Oscar Niemeyer; the philosopher and politician Roberto Mangabeira Unger; the educator Anísio Teixeira; the engineer Benjamin Constant; writers Clarice Lispector, Jorge Amado and Vinicius de Moraes; politicians Francisco Pereira Passos, Oswaldo Aranha and Pedro Calmon, besides the great physicians Carlos Chagas, Oswaldo Cruz and Vital Brazil.

== History ==
=== Creation ===
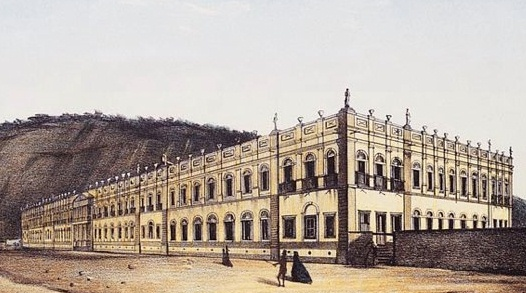
University Palace in the 19th century, when it functioned as a hospice. The building was given to University of Brazil only in 1949.

The Federal University of Rio de Janeiro is a direct descendant of Brazil's first higher education courses. Created on September 7, 1920 (Brazilian Independence Day) by president Epitácio Pessoa through the Law Decree 14343, the institution was initially named "University of Rio de Janeiro". Its history, however, is much vaster and parallel to that of the country's cultural, economic and social development (many of its courses trace back to the very foundations of Brazilian higher education system).

In its inception, the university was composed by the "Escola Politécnica" (Polytechnic School, founded on December 17, 1792 as Royal Academy of Artillery, Fortification and Design, during the reign of Portuguese Queen Maria I),, which subsequently became the Royal Military Academy of Rio de Janeiro.

The Medicine School, Faculdade Nacional de Medicina, traces back to April 2, 1808, when Dom João VI founded it under the name of Academy of Medicine and Surgery. The Law School, "Faculdade Nacional de Direito", came to exist after the fusion between the College of Legal and Social Sciences and the Free College of Law - both recognized by the Law Decree 693 of October 1, 1891).

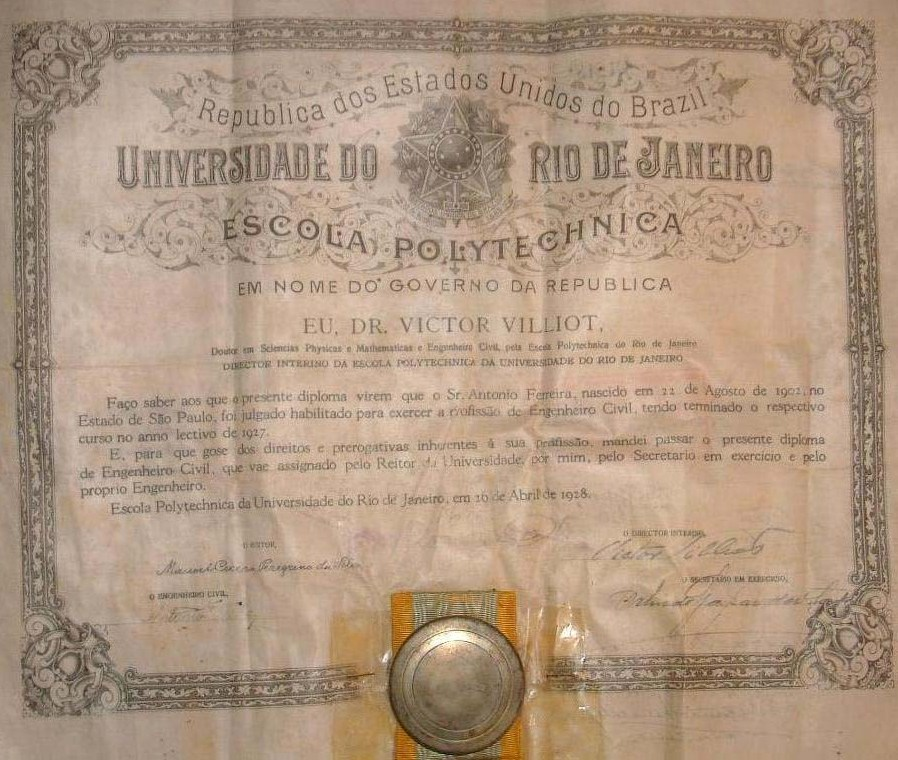
1928 diploma certificated by then-University of Rio de Janeiro

To these initial schools many others were progressively added, such as Fine Arts, "Escola Nacional de Belas Artes" and the "Faculdade Nacional de Filosofia" (National College of Philosophy). Thanks to such achievements, the UFRJ took a crucial role in the implantation of Brazilian higher education, which was in fact an aspiration from Brazilian intellectual elite since the country's colonial era. Due to the longstanding tradition of its pioneering courses, the university functioned as the "scholar mill" upon which most of Brazil's subsequent higher education institutions were molded.

=== Restructuring ===
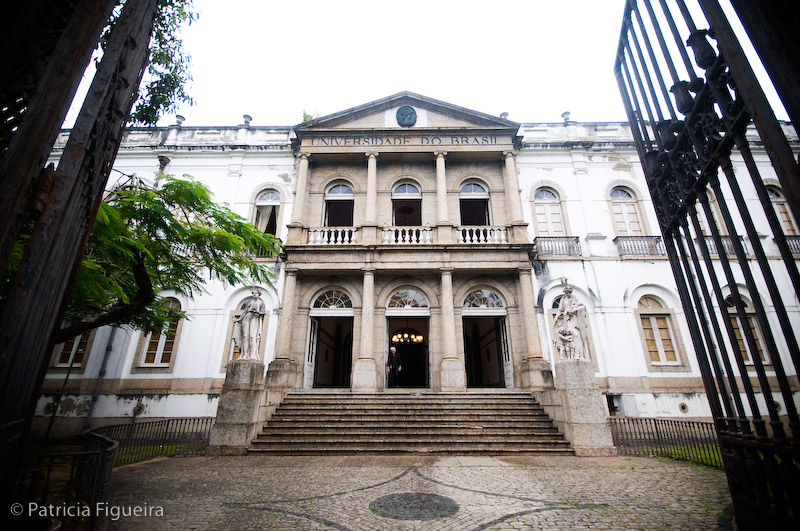
University Palace, neoclassical building finished in 1842. In the foreground, the Charity Statue, symbol of piety towards the ill (the facility originally functioned as a hospice).

In 1937, Getúlio Vargas's minister of education, Gustavo Capanema, announced a reform of the education system, under which the institution changed its name to the "University of Brazil". The change reflected the government's aim of controlling the quality of the national higher education system - mainly by setting a standard by which all other universities would have to conform. Such decision was strongly influenced by the French concept of university - that in which component schools are isolated in order to assume a specific professionalizing teaching method under strong state control -, which contrasted to the German model seen, for example, in the University of São Paulo, founded in 1934.

The early 1950s marked the institutionalization of research in the university, which consequentially led to the implementation of research institutes, full-time academic staff, instruction of highly specialized professors and the establishment of partnership with national and international financing agencies.

In 1958, occasion for the 150-year anniversary of the UFRJ's Medicine School, the university was faced by the urgent needs of a structural reform that stimulated deeper participation and cooperation among professors and students with college affairs and a more rational, efficiency-based use of public resources. After an ample sequence of debates and public consultations, the resulting plans for reforms in University of Brazil were quickly absorbed by the scientific community, set a new standard for national college planning and influenced even, among others, Brazilian communication industries and government's decisional spheres.

In 1965, under the government of general Castelo Branco, the university would achieve plain financial, didactic and academic autonomy - a condition called, according to Brazilian legislature, "autarchy" - and acquire its current name, which followed the still-active standard for federal university naming (i.e.: Federal University of name of State or region).

After the reformation process, the university was propelled into a deeper and riskier restructuring phase that aimed to make the institution fit for the recently approved Law Decree of March 13, 1967 - a situation widely regarded as too bold for a nation with recent history as an independent territory and a culture that, inheriting traits from the Portuguese colonial rule, heavily emphasized tradition and stability.

=== Present day ===
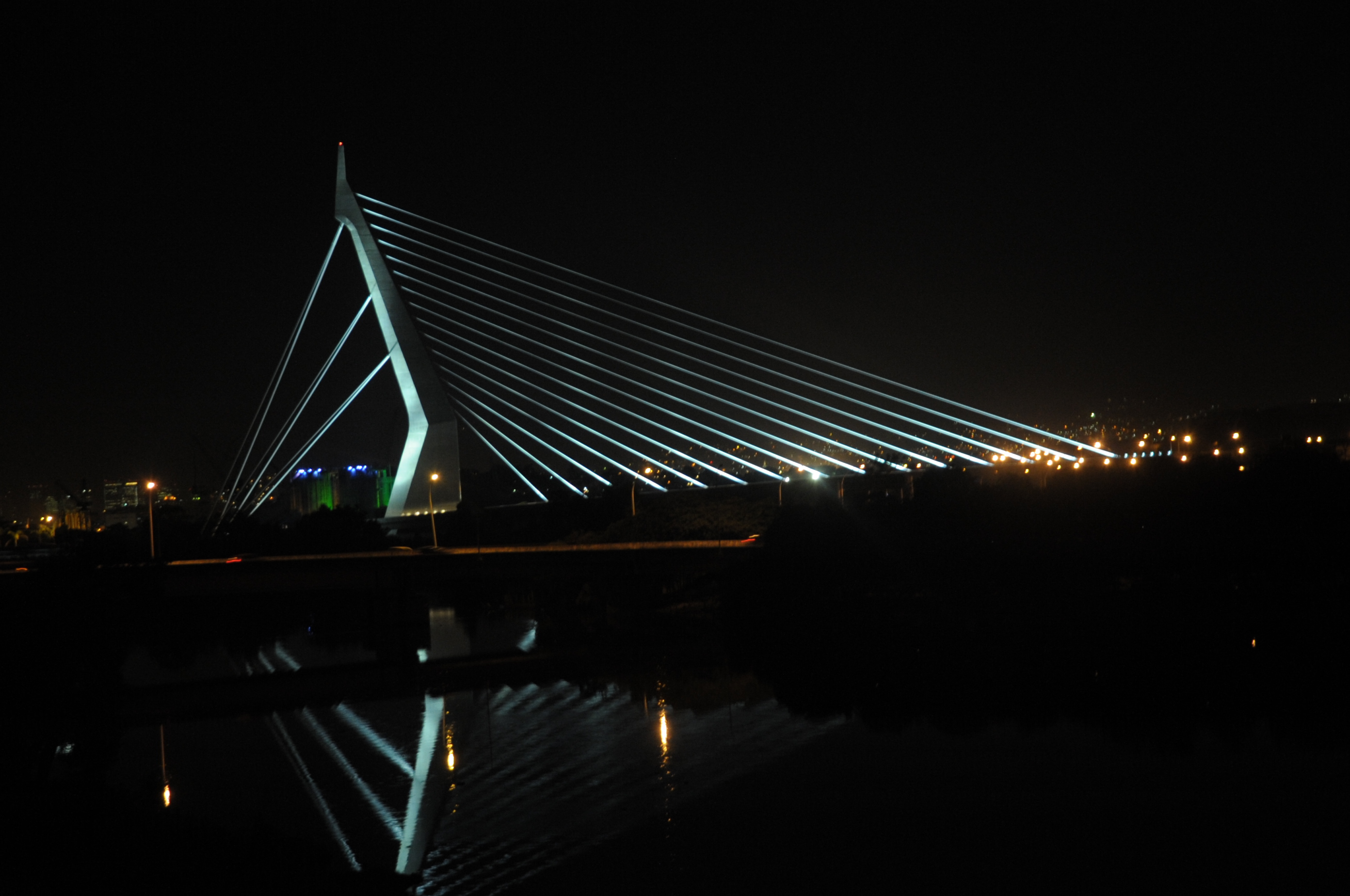
Ponte do Saber ("Knowledge Bridge") is one of the main exit points from the campus at Ilha do Fundão ("Backyard Island").

The UFRJ keeps an "open-doors policy" regarding foreigners who arrive at it to disseminate or accumulate expertise; this also allows for internship or job opportunities for its teaching staff in different institutions and areas of research. International interexchange and partnerships are profuse, leading to reformist tendencies that most of times successfully coexist with the university's strong traditional ties.

The UFRJ adopts the Roman goddess Minerva - patroness of the Arts and all professions; also associated with knowledge and intellectuality - as its mascot, and many sculptures depicting the goddess are seem scattered throughout the institution. In 2000, the rectory requested to the Federal Justice that the university's name was changed back to "University of Brazil", as the old name has been changed by an arbitrary decree during the country's years of military dictatorship. The request was deferred, so it is correct to address the university by either names.

The university manages an ambitious program for extension courses, consisting mostly in providing full-time education to financially debilitated non-students of varying education backgrounds. Besides, the UFRJ contributes heavily to Rio de Janeiro's public health with its nine college hospitals, providing for over one thousand vacancies, and its deep integration with the State's health treatment network. In 2010, the institution achieved a "very good" evaluation and a maximum score in the Ministry of Education's General Index of College Courses ("Índice Geral de Cursos", or IGC in Portuguese). Its clear emphasis on research alludes to the personal motto of one of its most famous and distinguished scientists:

In a university, one teaches because one researches.

— Carlos Chagas Filho

== Organization ==
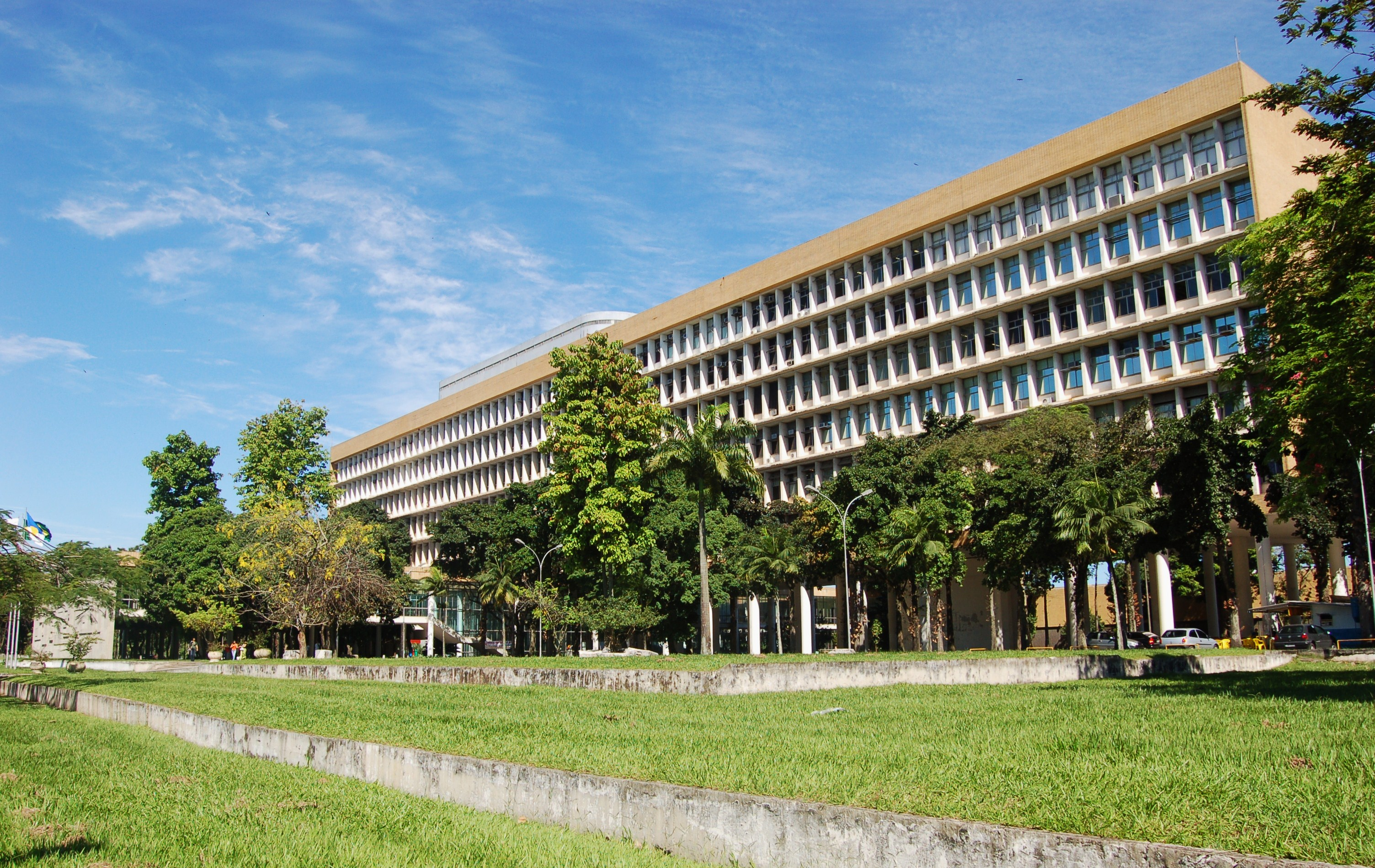
The Rectory building, designed by architect Jorge Machado Moreira and finished in 1957, was awarded in the same year at the IV Bienal Internacional de Arte de São Paulo. Its gardens were designed by Roberto Burle Marx.

=== Administration ===
The Federal University of Rio de Janeiro is an autarchy and a public institution linked to the Ministry of Education (MEC). Its administration is commanded by the superior councils: the "Conselho Universitário" (University Council), the highest decisional authority, presided by the "reitor" (rector); the "Conselho de Curadores" (Curators Council), responsible for the financial books and budgetary matters, also under rectorship rule; the "Conselho de Ensino de Graduação" (Undergraduate Council), responsible for admission to undergraduate course and other undergraduate affairs, presided by the pro-rector of graduation; and the "Conselho de Ensino para Graduados" (Graduate Council), responsible for research activities and post-graduation courses, presided by the pro-rector of post-graduation and research.

The institution is also directed by a vice-rector and six other pro-rectors. The rectors are nominated and chosen by the Ministry of Education (MEC) from a three-candidate list formed by a general election every four years. In general, the MEC respects the electoral decision, choosing the most voted candidate. The current rector (2014) is Carlos Antônio Levi da Conceição, with Antônio José Ledo Alves da Cunha as vice-rector.

The academic pro-rectories are as follows: "Pró-reitoria de Graduação" (Pro-Rectory of Undergraduate Studies), "Pró-reitoria de Pós-Graduação e Pesquisa" (Pro-Rectory of Research and Post-Graduate Studies), "Pró-reitoria de Planejamento e Desenvolvimento" (Pro-Rectory of Planning and Development), "Pró-reitoria de Pessoal" (Pro-Rectory of Human Resources), "Pró-reitoria de Extensão" (Pro-Rectory of Extension) e a Pró-reitoria de Gestão e Governança" (Pro-Rectory of Management and Governance).

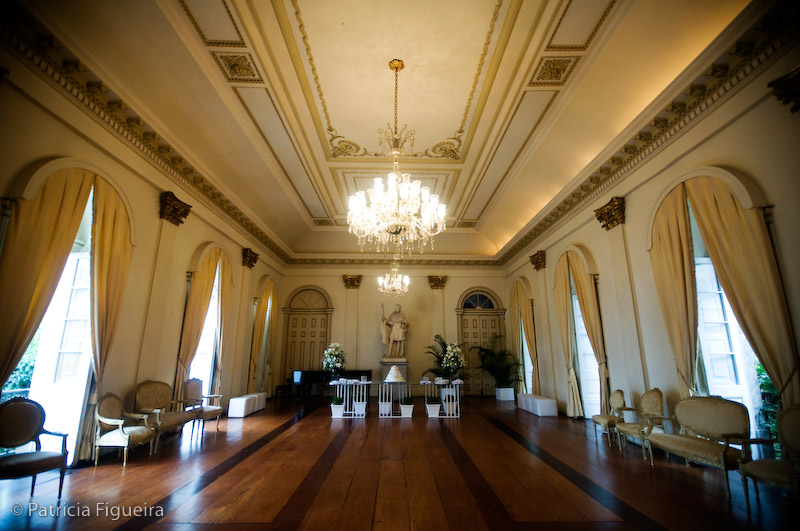
"Salão Dourado"

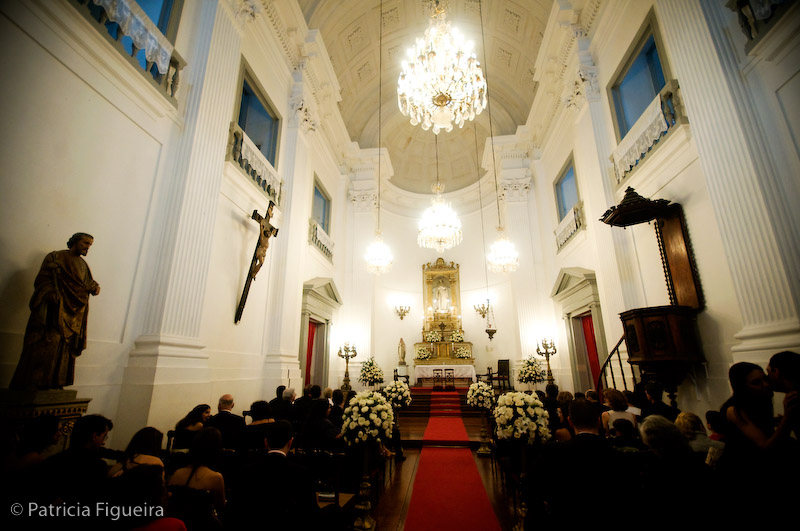
"Capela de São Pedro de Alcântara"

The University Pallace

Serving as executive institutions are a total of eleven superintendencies: "Superintendência Geral de Graduação" (General Superintendency of Undergraduate Studies), "Superintendência Geral de Pós-Graduação e Pesquisa" (General Superintendency of Research and Post-Graduate Studies), "Superintendência Geral de Planejamento e Desenvolvimento" (General Superintendency of Planning and Development), "Superintendência Geral de Finanças" (General Superintendency of Finances), "Superintendência Geral de Pessoal" (General Superintendency of Human Resources), "Superintendência Geral de Extensão" (General Superintendency of Extension), "Superintendência Geral de Gestão e Controle" (General Superintendency of Management and Control), "Superintendência Geral de Governança" (General Superintendency of Governance), "Superintendência Geral de Tecnologia da Informação e Comunicação Gerencial" (General Superintendency of Information Technology and Managerial Communication), "Superintendência Geral de Políticas Estudantis" (General Superintendency of Student Policies) e a "Superintendência Geral de Atividades Fora da Sede" (General Superintendency of Non-Campus Activities).

== Notable Rectors ==
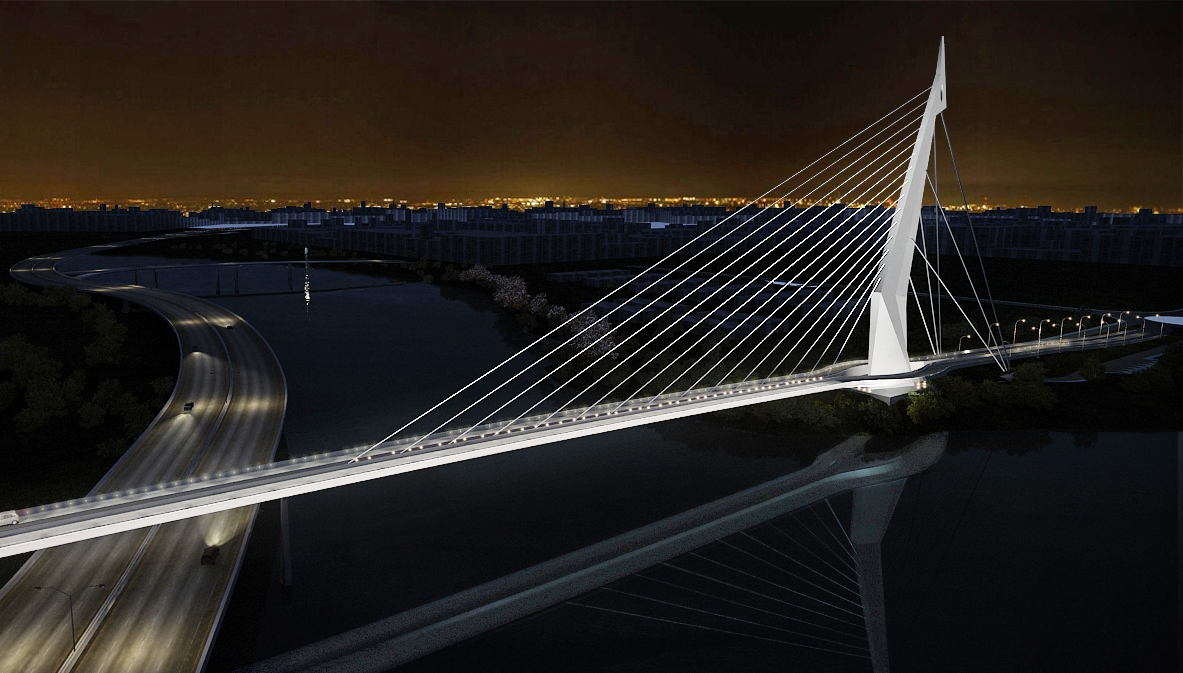
Night view of the University City: highlighted Saber bridge supported by 21 wires tied to a pylon.

Some of the famous figures that have held the post of rector in UFRJ are: Benjamin Franklin Ramiz Galvão, doctor, first-ever rector and former member of the Brazilian Academy of Literature(ABL); Raul Leitão da Cunha, doctor; Pedro Calmon, former minister of Education and Health; Deolindo Couto, former member of the ABL; Raymundo Augustto de Castro Moniz de Aragão, former minister of Education; Carlos Lessa, economist and former president of "Banco Nacional de Desenvolvimento Econômico e Social" (National Bank of Economic and Social Development, BNDS).

=== Statistics and heritage ===
According to its yearly statistical report (2013), the university controls 52 units and supplementary departments, each linked to one of six academic centers. It has a total of 48 454 active undergraduate students plus 7 333 students in undergraduate online courses, and a yearly graduation rate of 5 381 students. As of post-graduation studies, there are 5 389 individuals undergoing master's degree and 5 5382 candidates for doctor's degree. Of its 3 821 professors, 3 068 hold a doctor degree, 618 are masters and 61 are specialists. In addition, its high-school unit ("Colégio de Aplicação", or Application School) accounts for 760 enrolled students.

The university's main buildings are located at "Cidade Universitária" (College City, with 5.2 million m^{2}) in "Ilha do Fundão" (Backward Island), but the campus at "Praia Vermelha" (Red Beach, with 100 thousand m^{2}) still gathers a plethora of units and supplementary departments. Additionally, there are the Institute of Philosophy and Social Sciences, the Institute of History, the College of Law Studies, the Valongo Observatory, the School of Music, the Residence of College Students and the National Museum (53 276 40 m^{2}). Among the isolated health buildings there are the Maternity School, the São Francisco School-Hospital and the Anna Nery Nursery Schools. The UFRJ possesses additional campuses in Rio de Janeiro's Chile Avenue (8 550 m^{2}), in the cities of Macaé and Duque de Caxias (149 869,18 m^{2}), Jacarepaguá (10 000 m^{2}), Arraial do Cabo and in Santa Teresa (a 1.5 million m^{2} research-only wildlife reserve).

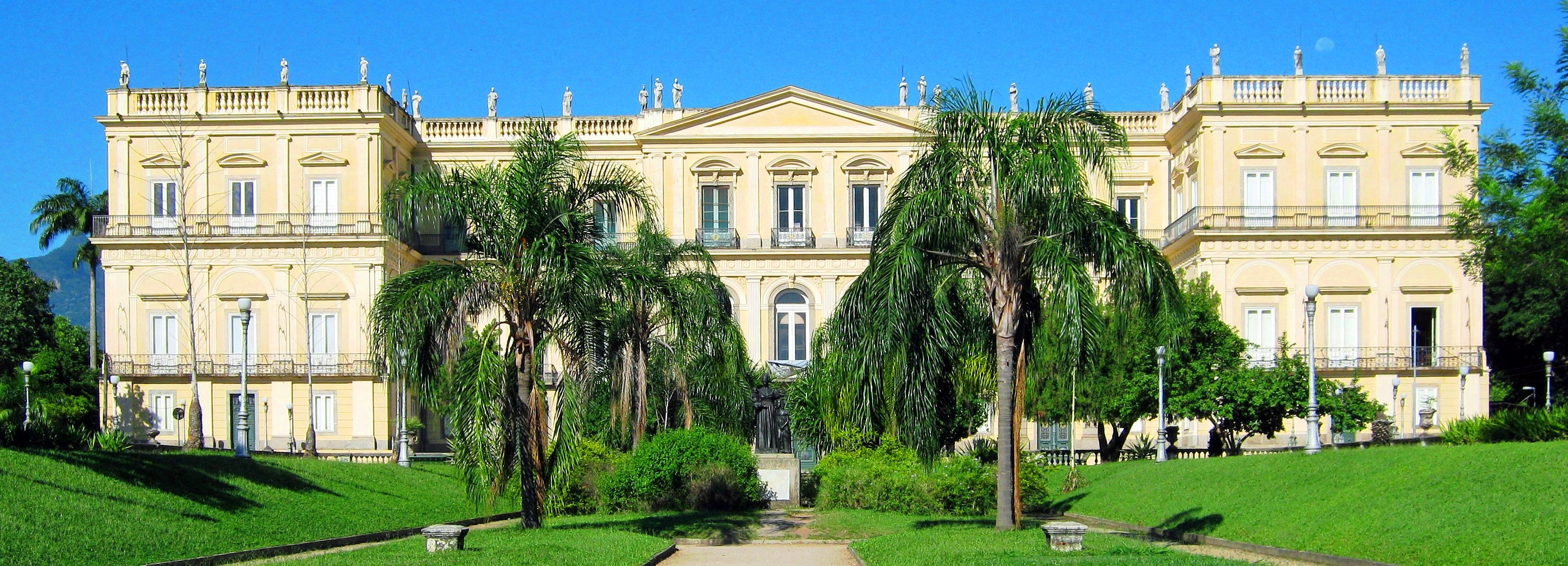
The National Museum is among the most important architectural heritages not only of the university, but of Brazilian society as a whole

== Structure ==
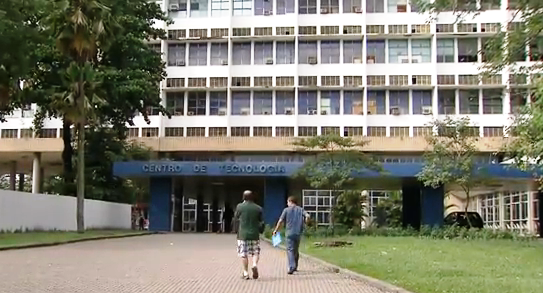
It is in the Center of Technology's Block A where the Institute of Chemistry and the Institute of Physics are housed.

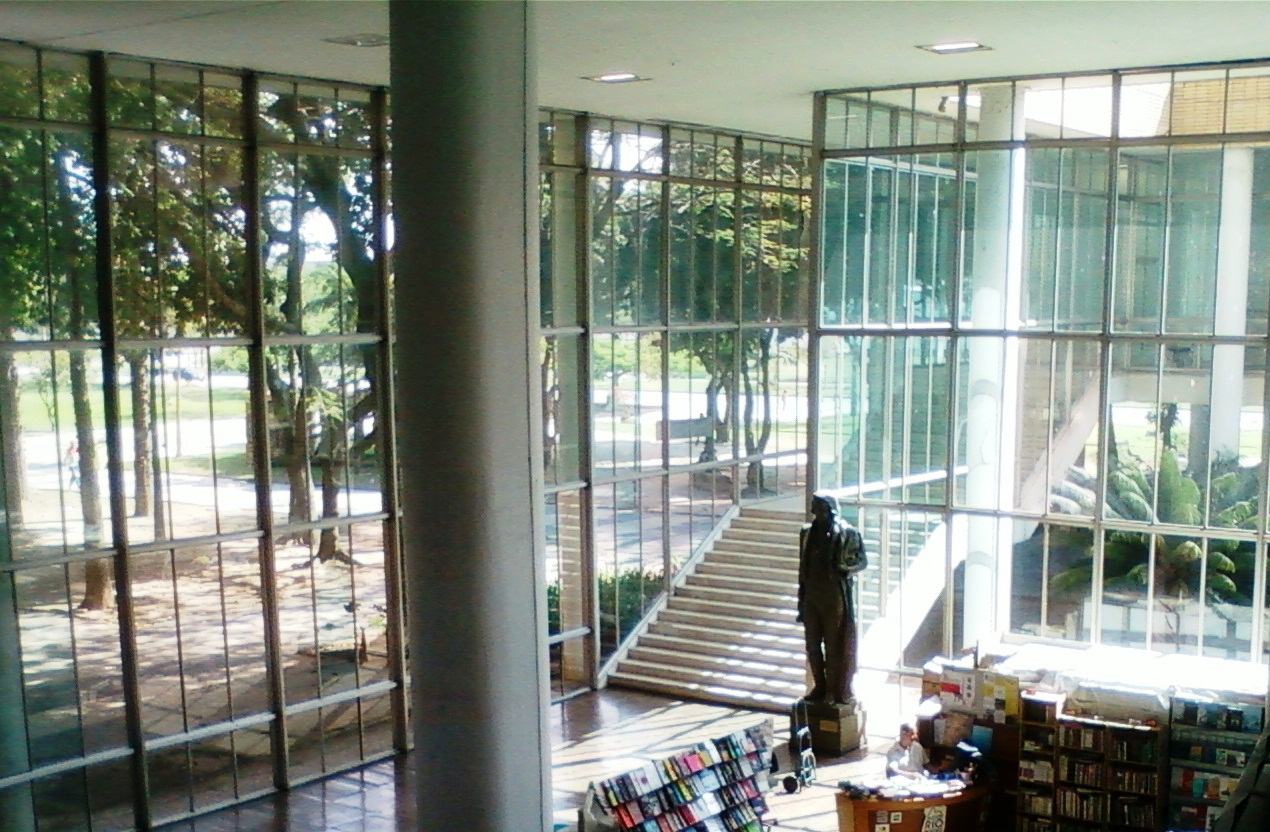
The university's modern-architecture City Hall is home of, besides the central bureau, the College of Fine Arts and the College of Architecture and Urbanism.

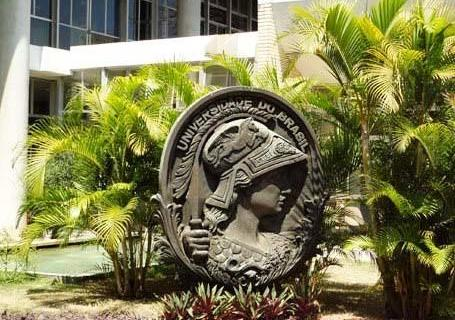
Garden in front of the Center of Technology

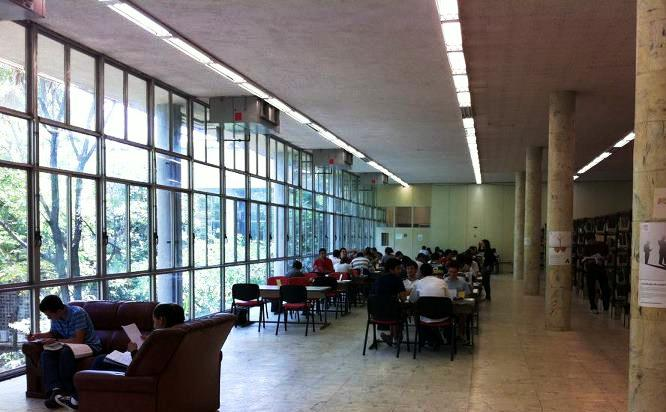
Students at the Center of Technology's Library

the UFRJ can be divided into six university centers plus the "Escritório Técnico da Universidade" (University Technical Department), the "Fórum da Ciência e Cultura" (Forum of Science and Culture, FCC) and the University City Hall. Each center is made of dozens of units and supplementary organs responsible for education, research and extension in their respective areas of knowledge.

=== University Centers ===
- Center of Health Sciences (CCS): the university's largest, involved in activities and research related to biosciences. As a whole, it gathers ten units and fourteen supplementary organs: three hospitals, three "nuclei" (headquarters), two schools, three colleges and thirteen institutes. Activities are developed mostly at CCS's main building at College City, but there are also units at Praia Vermelha, in downtown Rio, in Macaé and in Xerém.
- Center of Technology (CT): the university's second largest center, it manages two sprawling engineering schools and two high-tech research institutes, all located at College City. The CT also controls two business incubators and one foundation focused at technological studies. These units were all previous to the center's foundation, each with a unique history, and their performance is crucial to the national technological environment, given that together they form one of the country's most influential tech-poles.
- Center of Mathematical and Natural Sciences (CCMN): originated from the traditional and influential National School of Philosophy, it is made of five institutes and one observatory. Its main infrastructure is located at College City. The Institute of Chemistry and the Institute of Physics are located at Center of Technology's Block A and the Institute of Mathematics, at its Block C, but both are units of CCMN. The Valongo Observatory is placed near the Mauá Park, at the top of Morro da Conceição, and it is the country's only federal institution to offer undergraduate course in Astronomy.
- Center of Law and Economic Sciences (CCJE): responsible for activities concerning applied social sciences: administration, economics, law, library science and urban planning. It gathers three units (schools) and two supplementary organs (institutes) scattered throughout College CIty, Praia Vermelha and downtown Rio.
- Center of Philosophy and Human Sciences (CFHC): encompasses interdisciplinary academic activities regarding social sciences, especially those with theoretical focus on society formation. The CFCH is made of six units (two schools, one college and three institutes) and two supplementary organs (one headquarter and the Application College, which supports professor-training courses). The CFHC is locates mainly at the campus of Praia Vermelha, though some minor buildings are found in the regions of Largo do São Francisco and Lagoa.
- Center of Literature and Arts (CLA): similar to the other centers, it was founded in 1967. It currently comprises four traditional units of UFRJ: two schools and two colleges focused on the arts, language and architecture. Its main buildings are placed at College City, except for the School of Music, which is located at downtown Rio.
- COPPEAD Graduate School of Business (COPPEAD): The UFRJ School of the Business founded in 1973, located in its own building on the campus of UFRJ Fundão Island is the only business school associated with a Brazilian public university that has international certification, whose is the only of Latin America listed among the 100 best in the world by the prestigious Financial Times ranking.

=== Units and supplementary organs ===
The so-called "units" and "supplementary organs" are institutions of basically two types: schools/colleges, destined to professional training, research and extension; and institutes, destined to basic research, extension and teaching of a specific area of knowledge. Generally, units deal with undergraduate and postgraduate courses while supplementary organs are charged with coordinating disciplines according to each specific line of research. Additionally, there are "research nuclei", which fall into the category of "supplementary organs". As in most Brazilian universities, these two institutional sets are subdivided into departments.

=== Libraries and museums ===
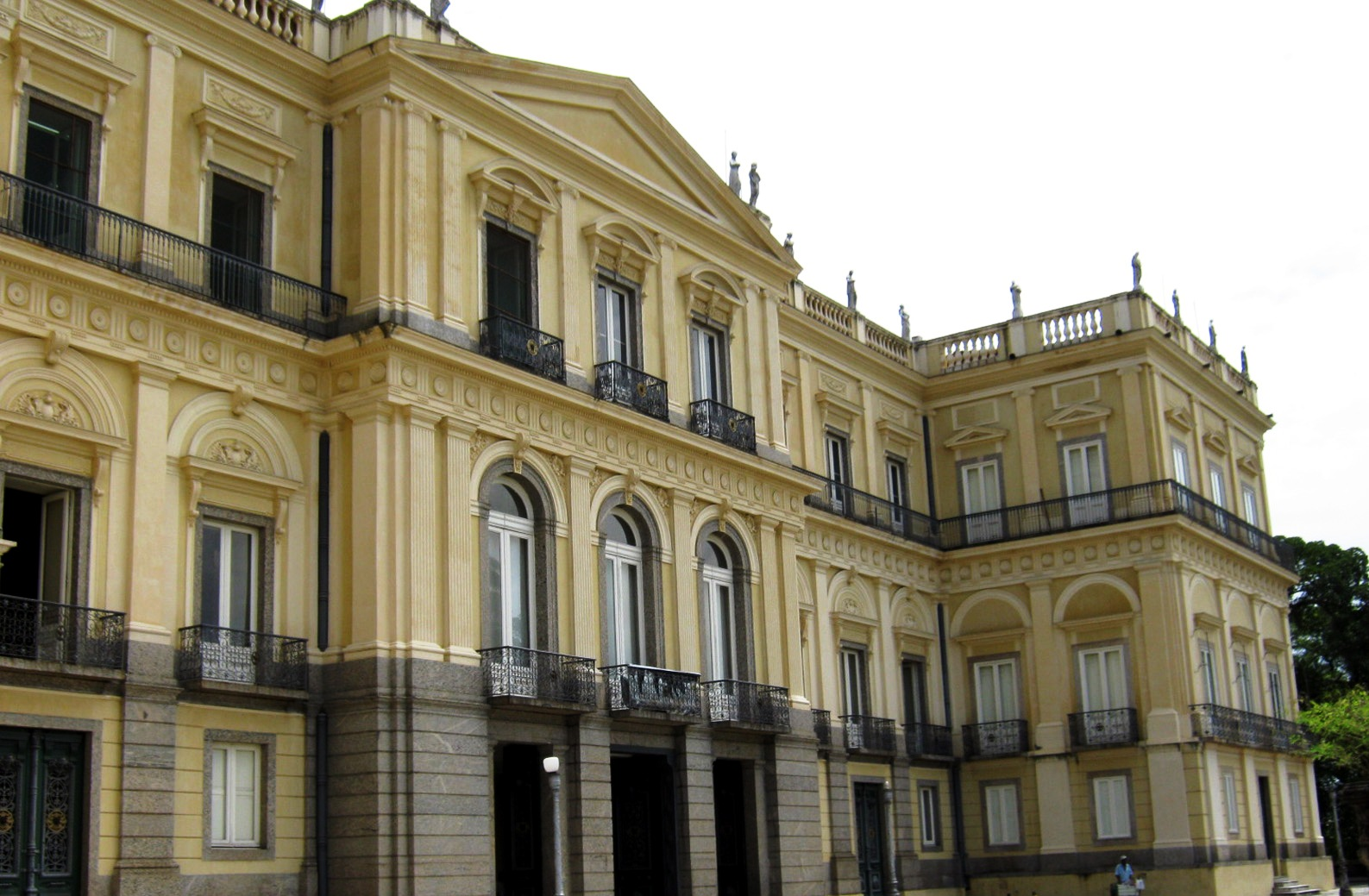
The National Museum, built from the Brazilian Imperial Family's old residence in "Paço de São Cristóvão" (Palace of São Cristóvão).

Keeping important historical documents of both national and international relevance, UFRJ's libraries and museums can be considered the primary source of inquiry for the country's most renowned researchers. In 1983, the university implanted the System of Libraries and Information (SiBI), through which students and staff enjoy easy and speedy access to the entire collection of its forty three libraries. General (i.e. non-affiliated to the institution) digital access to UFRJ's libraries is made through the Minerva Base, a database that, much like the SiBI, gathers all university libraries into a single website.

Among the most noteworthy museums and cultural spaces are: the National Museum, Latin America's largest museum and anthropological of natural history as well as Brazil's oldest scientific institution. Its building is a conversion from the Brazilian Imperial Family's old palace in "Paço de São Cristóvão" and it was founded by royal figure Dom João VI in 1818, but integrated to the university only much afterwards, in 1946. Brazil's emperor Dom Pedro II himself, an enthusiast for scientific knowledge, contributed to the museum's collection with Egyptian art, fossils, botanic species and many other items obtained during his personal trips. Laboratories occupy a great portion of the museum and spread to some buildings raised in "Horto Botânico" (Botanic Garden), in "Quinta da Boa Vista".

In Botafogo, the university also manages the "Casa da Ciência" (House of Science), a cultural center of science and technology active since 1995 and dedicated to the exploration of languages and of popular forms of communication such as theater, music and audiovisual techniques. It performs periodical workshops and expositions opened to both students and the general public.

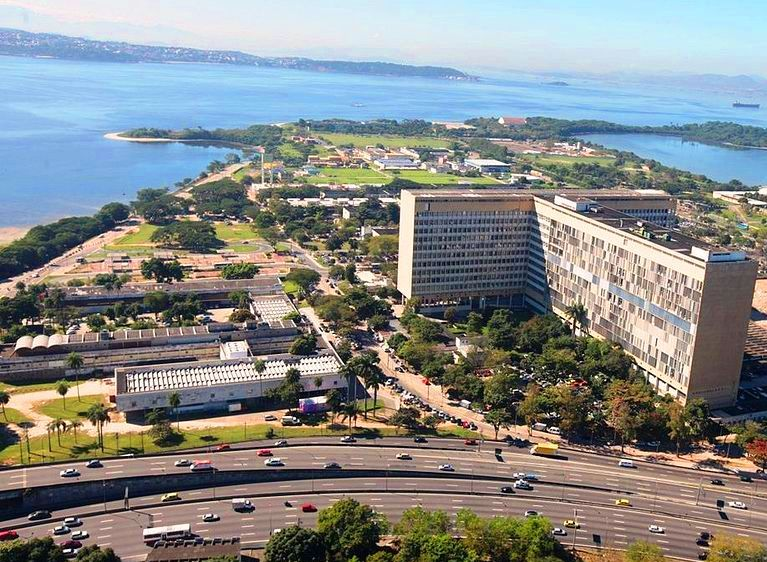
Access to the Clementino Fraga Filho University Hospital (HUCFF) is made through the Red Line of João Goulard Freeway, which passes through the northern area of UFRJ's College City (main campus).

=== Health complex ===
The university's medical-hospital network is composed of nine supplementary organs distributed throughout various campuses. Together, these units are responsible for 566 410 treatments, 8 293 surgeries and 18 555 hospitalizations every year.

- Clementino Fraga Filho University Hospital (HUCFF): created in 1978, it is UFRJ's flagship medical institution. Sprawling through 110 000 meters squared, it is both national and international reference in high surgical procedures of high complexity.
- São Francisco de Assis Institute of Health (HESFA): founded in the 19th century as School Hospital and reopened in 1988 by then-rector Luís Renato Caldas. Sustaining a profile of high-quality customer service clinic, it acts on medical procedures of low or medium complexity and focuses on patients requiring long-term care and hospitalization.
- Institute of Psychiatry (IPUB): acts as Latin America's flagship research, post-graduation learning and knowledge-diffuser institution regarding multidisciplinary studies in psychiatry and mental health.
- Martagão Gesteira Institute of Childcare and Pediatrics (IPPMG): institute of nationwide recognition in matters of childcare, it was incorporated to the university after formal proposal from professor Joaquim Martagão Gesteira. It undergoes research in the mother-child field and acts on assistance and teaching and training in pediatrics.
- Institute of Chest Diseases (IDT): founded in 1957 by professor Antonio Ibiapina and, since 2000, adjunct to HUCFF's main structure. Promotes full-time assistance and undergoes research regarding respiratory illnesses.
- Deolindo Couto Institute of Neurology (INDC): located at Praia Vermelha campus, is responsible for activities, research, teaching and assistance in the fields of neurology and neurosurgery.
- Institute of Gynecology (IG): founded in 1947 and located at university hospital "Moncorvo Filho". Notable for providing radio-therapeutic services specifically for matters of gynecology ontology.
- Edson Saad Institute of Heart (ICES): founded in 2003 to develop high-quality research in the fields of cardiology and vascular surgery. The institute initiated its activities in old departments from HUCFF and the School of Medicine.
- Maternity School (ME): founded in 1904 to assist pregnant women and newly born children from unprivileged social backgrounds in the State of Rio de Janeiro. It was pioneer in the use of, among other methods, ultrasonography and dopplerfluxometry in Brazil.

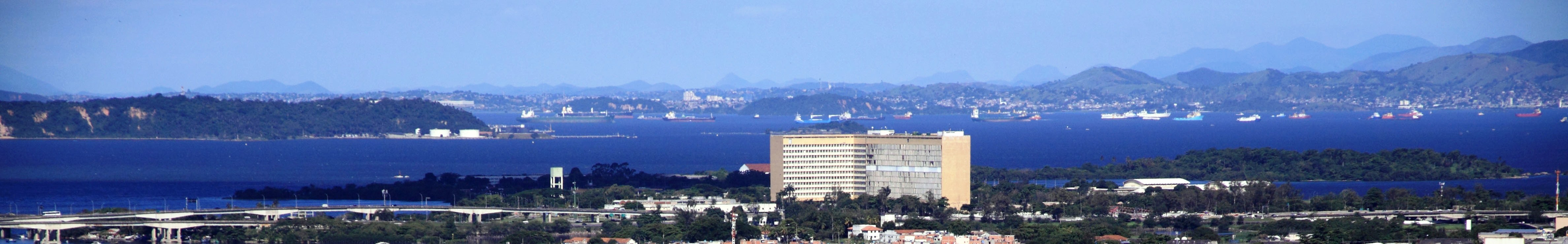
The Clementino Fraga Filho University Hospital (HUCFF) at College City, seen from Nossa Senhora da Penha Church: at the center, the hospital's main building and, in the background, the famous Guanabara Bay.

== Campuses ==
=== Rio de Janeiro ===
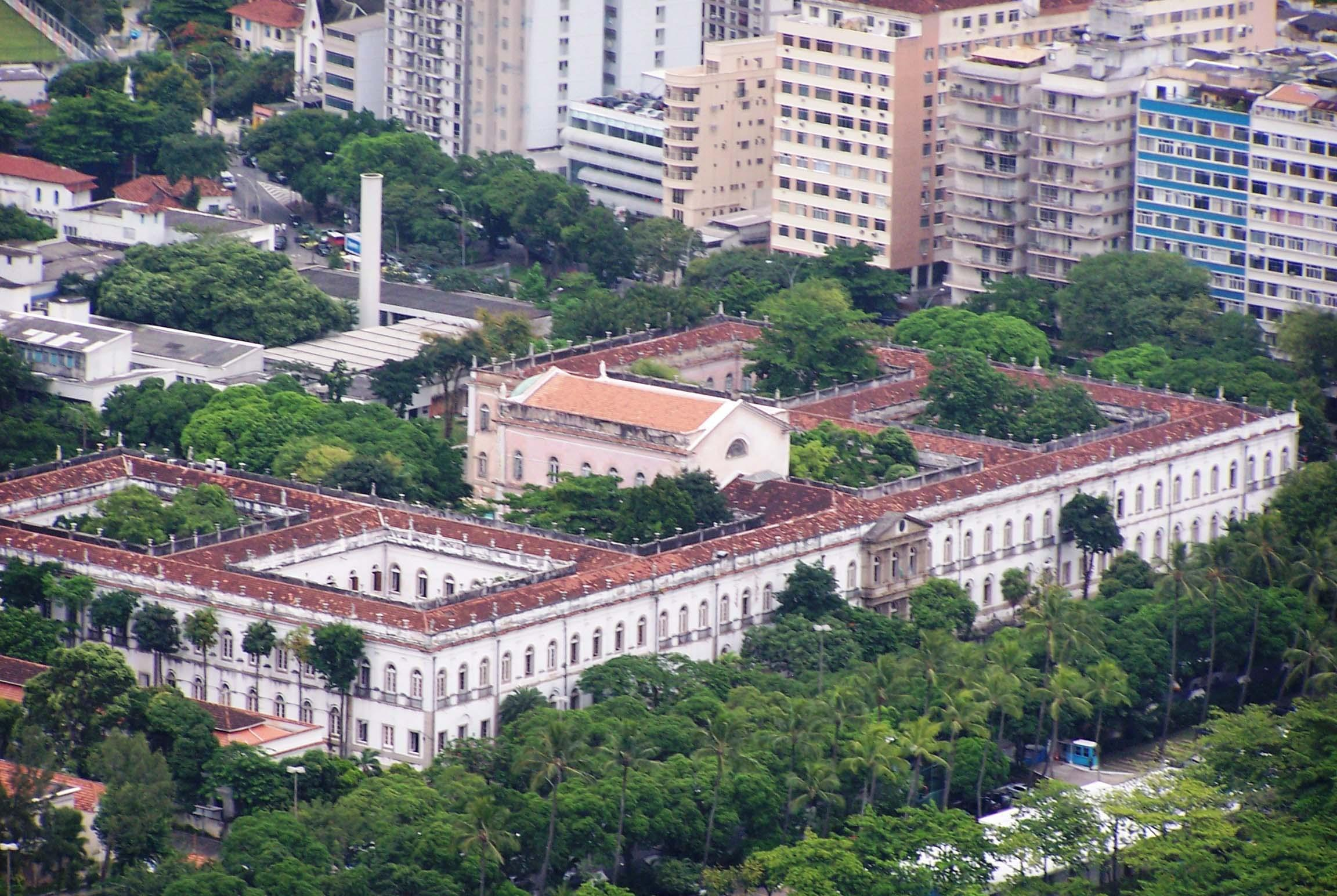
The Palácio Universitário, a 19th-century neoclassical building that serves as campus of the UFRJ. The Institutes for Economics, Education, Communications and Administration, among others, are based here.

The Federal University of Rio de Janeiro's main infrastructure is the College City, located at and occupying almost all of Ilha do Fundão (Backyard Island), northern Rio de Janeiro. The island was artificially created in 1950 by the union of various already existing islands through embankment techniques. Academic activities in the campus, however, would only start in 1970, and the initial project stated that all active courses would be transferred to the city. Architecture was hugely influenced by modernism and some designs were even awarded, such as the rectory building (designed by Jorge Machado Moreira and awarded at the "IV Bienal de São Paulo").

The campus has a residence complex for undergraduate students (504 rooms), three university restaurants (commonly called "bandejões", or "big trays"), a sports center, and banking agencies. In 2010, there was the opening of an integration station for the unified college transport system, aiming for more security and comfort to the college community. Dozens of 24/7 inter-campus bus lines, free for students, are connected to the College City, plus regular urban and intercity lines serving the population of Baixada Fluminense region and of metropolitan Rio de Janeiro.

The campus at Praia Vermelha (Red Beach), locates at Urca, southern Rio, concentrates on courses related mainly to human sciences. Its largest and most historically notable building is the University Pallace, a neoclassical-style premise built between 1842 and 1852 to serve as a hospice, which was inaugurated by emperor Dom Pedro II only ten years later. In 1949, the building was given to the University of Brazil, which then restored and expanded its facilities.

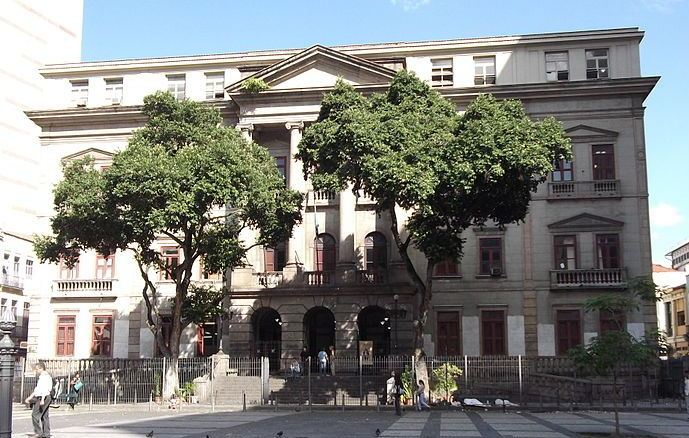
Building of both the Institute of Philosophy and Social Sciences and the Institute of History at "Largo de São Francisco de Paula.

In the downtown of Rio de Janeiro, one can find many isolated college units: the College of Law Studies, at Conde dos Arcos Palace, former headquarter of Brazilian senate; the School of Music, planted in the old National Library building since 1913; the Valongo Observatory at the top of "Morro da Conceição" (Conceição Hill); the Institute of Philosophy and Social Sciences and the Institute of History, both situated in the old National School of Engineering building, at "Largo de São Francisco de Paula".

In the 2010-2020 UFRJ Master Plan a project was set for conversion of the Praia Vermelha campus into a great cultural center, consequentially transferring almost all of the campus' academic activities, plus that of all of college units scattered throughout Rio, to the College City, thus redeeming the city's original intent of centering all university activities in Ilha do Fundão. The decision has generated strong polemic with both students and staff, given the great distances between southern (Praia Vermelha) and northern (Ilha do Fundão) Rio and the chaotic traffic that plagues the Red Line of João Goulart Freeway - the "jugular" connecting the College City to Rio.

Aloísio Teixeira, then rector and strong advocate for the integration, argued that the University Palace can bear a circulation of no more than two to three thousand people per day, and that the College City's major problems are not on its structure, but on its access points which are more easily fixable matters. Aiming to solve part of the city's traffic problem, in mid-2010 Rio de Janeiro saw the building of its first cable-stayed bridge, named "Ponte do Saber" (Knowledge Bridge), which was inaugurated in 2012 to receive a daily average of 25,000 vehicles.

=== Duque de Caxias ===
Through its biophysics undergraduate course, started in the second half of 2008, UFRJ initiated activities in Xerém, a region with large industrial and technological potential in the city of Duque de Caxias. Aiming to cooperate with Inmetro (National Institute of Metrics, Normalization and Industrial Quality), the university forged a partnership with the government of Duque de Caxias and with the Foundation for Technological Development and Social Policies. Currently, and additionally to biophysics, the Xerém campus offers undergraduate courses in biotechnology and nanotechnology, both added in the first half of 2010. As of the following year, there was the addition of the professional master's in Scientific Formation for Biology Teachers, targeted at professors of the biosciences looking for skill improvement. Students have Inmetro's infrastructure and laboratories at hand, but most students and staff whose main laboratories are at Ilha do Fundão still have to complete their academic internships at College City. In an attempt to fix this inconvenience, Inmetro agreed to concede its Xerém infrastructures to UFRJ, which was then reinaugurated as a full campus in 2012.

=== Macaé ===
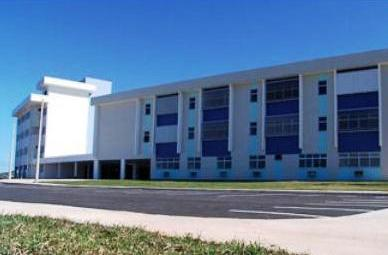
University complex in Macaé, at northern Rio de Janeiro (state).

UFRJ has operated in the city of Macaé since the 1980s, when researchers from its Institute of Biology performed studies in the lakes of "Região dos Lagos" (literally, Lake Regions). In partnership with the city, it instituted the Macaé Nucleus for Ecological Researches (NUPEM) in 1994. The university's recognition in and importance to the city was so visible that, in 2012, the City Hall has donated to the institution a 29,000 m^{2} terrain, in which was raised a new university center. In 2005, NUPEM was officialized as a supplementary organ of the Center of Health Sciences and, in 2006, the university implemented its first course outside Rio de Janeiro, professor training in the biosciences, to be taken in NUPEM's headquarters. In 2007, Macaé inaugurated a full university complex with two buildings and seven more planned ones, for graduation, post-graduation and extension courses. During this solemnity there was also the signing of the "Protocolo de Intenções" (Intentions Protocol) between UFRJ and the city, promising the initiation of chemistry and pharmacy courses in 2008.

Currently, the campus is physically distributed among four poles (University Pole, Barreto, Novo Cavaleiros and Ajuda), where the following undergraduate courses are offered: biological sciences, chemistry, nursing and obstetrics, engineering (production, civil and mechanical), pharmacy, medicine, and nutrition; as of post-graduation courses, there are two: environmental and conservation sciences, and bioactive and biosciences products. The main campus was named after former rector Aloísio Teixeira, incumbent from 2003 to 2011, in 2012 (Campus UFRJ–Macaé Professor Aloísio Teixeira), honoring his decisive contribution to the spreading of UFRJ through the State of Rio de Janeiro.

=== E-learning poles ===
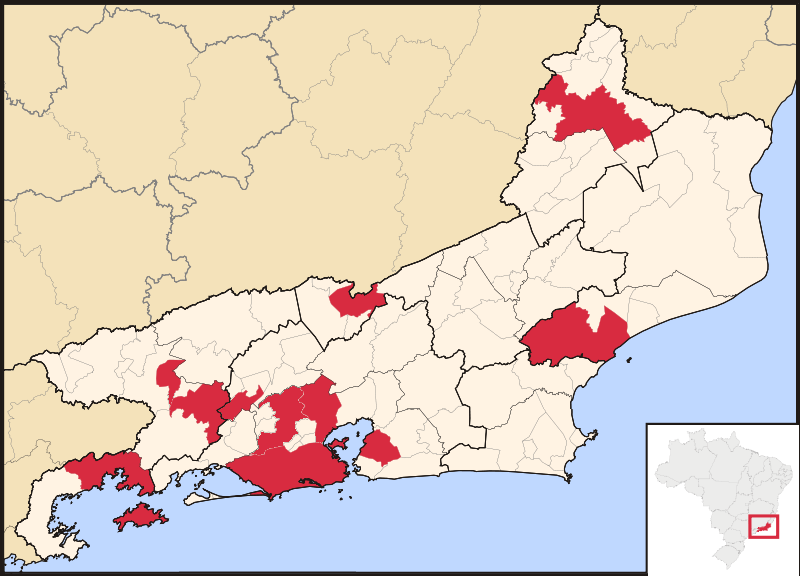
Map of the state of Rio de Janeiro highlighting the cities where UFRJ, either by its physical or e-learning courses, is active (in red).

E-learning courses are offered by the CEDERJ (Rio de Janeiro Center of Higher-Education E-learning) consortium, signed between UFRJ and the following institutions: Universidade Federal do Estado do Rio de Janeiro (UNIRIO), Universidade Federal Fluminense (UFF), Universidade Federal Rural do Rio de Janeiro (UFRRJ), Universidade do Estado do Rio de Janeiro (UERJ), Universidade Estadual do Norte Fluminense Darcy Ribeiro (UENF) and Centro Federal de Educação Tecnológica Celso Suckow da Fonseca (CEFET/RJ).

Taught in a mixed scheme where some activities require the students' physical presence, UFRJ offers professor training courses in the biosciences, physics, and chemistry. At the course's conclusion, a student is awarded with a certificate equivalent to that of physically based courses offered by the institution, according to each student's chosen e-learning pole. Admission are made by an independent "vestibular" organized by the consortium. UFRJ's e-learning poles in the State of Rio de Janeiro are: Angra dos Reis, Duque de Caxias, Itaperuna, Macaé, Nova Iguaçu, Paracambi, Piraí, Rio de Janeiro, São Gonçalo, Três Rios, and Volta Redonda.

== Academics ==
=== Undergraduate courses ===
There are 179 undergraduate courses covering all areas of human knowledge and distributed into four types: morning, afternoon, night and integral (all previous three combined) courses. Each courses is linked to one academic institution, but some share multiple institutions, like the nanotechnology course, which is offered by the Polytechnic School, the "Instituto de Biofísica Carlos Chagas Filho" (Institute of Biophysics Carlos Chagas Filho), the Institute of Physics and the "Instituto de Macromoléculas Professora Eloisa Mano" (Institute of Machomolecules Professor Eloisa Mano). Below are listed all offered courses and the respective specializations (including emphases, habilitations or modalities) for which students can opt during their graduation.

Biosciences

* Biophysics
- Bioinformatics
- Systems biology
- Structural biology
- Biotechnology
- Toxic environment
- Biomedicine
* Biotechnology
- Ecology
- Biomedicine
- Biological engineering
- Botanics
* Biology
- Sealife biology
- Vegetal biology
- Ecology
- Genetics
- Licensing
- Zoology
- Physical education
- Nursing
- Pharmacology
- Physiotherapy
- Speech
- Gastronomy
- Medicine
- Microbiology
- Nutrition
- Dentistry
- Public Health
- Occupational therapy

Exact Sciences

* Astronomy
- Astrophysics
- Computational astronomy
- Instrumental astronomy
- Mathematical astronomy
- Diffusion of astronomy
- Computer science
* Mathematics and earth sciences
- Analyst decision support
- Remote sensing and gis
- Earth sciences and natural heritage
- Environmental engineering
* Civil engineering
- Building
- Geotechnics
- Transportation
- Structural engineering
- Water resources and environment.
- Food engineering
- Bioprocess engineering
- Computer and information engineering
- Control and automation engineering
- Materials engineering
- Petroleum engineering
* Production engineering
- Economic engineering
- Production Management
- Electrical engineering
- Electronics and computer engineering
* Mechanical engineering
- Acoustics
- Machine design
- Mechanical manufacture
- Thermosciences
- Metallurgical engineering
- Naval and oceanic engineering
- Nuclear engineering
- Chemical engineering
- Statistics
- Physics
- Medical physics
- Geology
* Mathematics
- Computational mathematics
- Mathematical statistics
* Applied mathematics
- Scientific computing
- Mathematics for business
- Math for biological sciences
- Meteorology
* Nanotechnology
- Bionanotechnology
- Physics
- Materials.
- Chemistry
- Chemistry with technology assignments
- Industrial chemistry

Humanities

* Administration
- International management
- Corporate strategy
- Finance and control
- Logistics
- Marketing
- Human resources
- Architecture and urbanism
* Performing arts
- Scenography
- Theater directing
- Clothing
- Library Science
- Actuarial science
* Accounting
- Financial accounting
- Management accounting business
- Economics
- Social science
- Composition of interiors
- Landscaping
* Social communication
- Journalism
- Editorial production
- Advertising and propaganda
- Radio and tv
- Visual communication
- Preservation and restoration
* Dance
- Choreography and interpretation
- Dance, and image creation
* International defence and strategic management
- Defence and strategic affairs
- National and regional security strategy for development
- International health and global environmental issues
* Industrial design
- Visual communication
- Product project
- Drama
- Law
* Arts education
- Fine arts
- Drawing
- Sculpture
- Philosophy
- Geography
* Public management
- Public sector management
- Management of the third sector
- Engraving
- History
- History of art
* Languages
- German
- Arabic
- Spanish
- French
- Ancient greek
- Hebrew
- English
- Italian
- Japanese
- Classical latin
- Literature
- Russian
* Music
- Singing
- Clarinet
- Musical composition
- Contrabass
- Harpsichord
- Bassoon
- Flute
- Harp
- Percussion instrument
- Oboe
- Organ
- Piano
- Maestro
- Saxophone
- Trombone
- Trumpet
- Tuba
- Viola
- Guitar
- Violin
- Cello
* Pedagogy
- Teaching magisterium normal course
- Teaching early childhood education
- Elementary school teaching
- Painting
- Psychology
- International relations
- Social service
- Theory of dance

=== Postgraduate courses ===
There are 345 post-graduation courses, being 167 lato sensu (specialization) and 178 stricto sensu (master's and doctor's degrees). Similarly to the undergraduate courses, each post-grad course is linked to a specific academic institution. As of 2010, there were 1 965 scholarship programs from Coordination of Higher-Education Personnel Improvement (CAPES) available to post-graduation candidates, 844 from the National Council of Technologic and Scientific Development (CNPq) and 800 from the university itself.

== Students ==
=== Admissions ===
Similarly to most Brazilian public universities, admissions to the Federal University of Rio de Janeiro are defined by highly competitive entrance exams held every year (commonly known in Brazil as "vestibular"). Anyone who was already graduated from high school is eligible to the undergraduate courses. Admission is also possible by transfer (known as "external transfer"), exemption from exams ("reentrance") or by international partnerships.

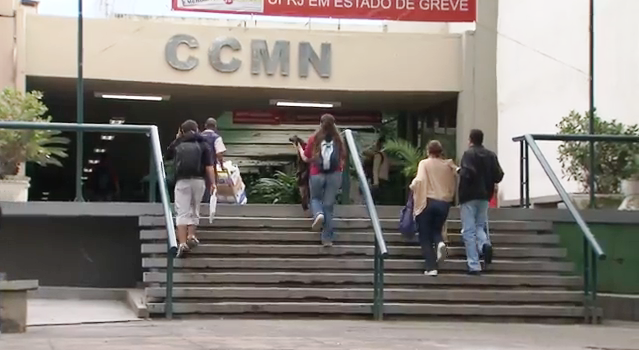
UFRJ's Center of Mathematical and Natural Sciences houses the Coordination for Undergraduate Courses Admission.

Until the late 1980s, the admission exam was managed as a unified "vestibular" by Cesgranrio Foundation. Given the university's disagreement with the test's methodology - which consisted almost entirely in multiple-choice questions -, the institution quit the partnership and organized its own "vestibular", named "Concurso de Acesso aos Cursos de Graduação" (Undergraduate Courses Admission Exam). The test was solely based on open-ended responses, and its elaborate questions eventually led it to be considered one of Brazil's toughest and most demanding higher education admission exams.

Since 2012, the university responded favorably to the utilization of the "Exame Nacional do Ensino Médio" (High School National Exam, or ENEM; a yearly nationwide exam managed by the Ministry of Education) for student admission. The exam's importance grew to the point that, in 2011, the UFRJ extinguished its "Concurso de Acesso" and made the ENEM its single admission exam; candidates' selection was delegated to the "Sistema de Seleção Unificada" (Unified Selection System, or SiSU; also under the Ministry of Education's rule). UFRJ quickly became one of the most coveted institutions in the system: as of the second semester of 2012, it received 103 829 applications, the highest of any other university in SiSU.

The institution also adheres to affirmative action policies since 2010: currently, 30% of all vacancies are reserved by some form of affirmative action measure; the most common basis for selection under this system is through socioeconomic standards, favoring students with public schooling backgrounds and whose families earn less than one and a half minimum wage (R$1 086/month, or roughly US$15/day, as of January, 2014).

=== Notable alumni ===
- Anthropologists: Eduardo Viveiros de Castro, and Gilberto Velho
- Architect: Oscar Niemeyer, Nora Tausz Rónai
- Artists: Ary Barroso, Vinícius de Moraes, Mário Lago, Ângela Leal, and Ivan Lins
- Billionaires: André Esteves, Carlos Alberto Sicupira
- Biologists: Lúcia Mendonça Previato
- Chemist: Otto Gottlieb
- Doctors: Vital Brazil, Carlos Chagas, Osvaldo Cruz, Carlos Chagas Filho, Herman Lent, and Mauricio Rocha e Silva
- Economists: Carlos Lessa, Joaquim Levy, Jose A. Scheinkman, and Mário Henrique Simonsen
- Educator: Anísio Teixeira
- Engineers: Luiz Bevilacqua, Maurício Botelho, Fernando Lobo Carneiro, Mauricio Carrasco , Benjamin Constant, Heródoto Bento de Mello, Aïda Espinola, Maria das Graças Foster, Giulio Massarani, Tércio Pacitti e Paulo de Frontin, Francisco Pereira Passos, Luiz Pinguelli Rosa, and Belkis Valdman
- Entrepreneur: Maurício Botelho, and Fabio Coelho
- Historians: Sérgio Buarque de Holanda, Francisco Falcon, and José Honório Rodrigues
- Journalists: Fátima Bernardes, and Ali Kamel
- Mathematicians: Artur Ávila, Elon Lages Lima, Leopoldo Nachbin, and Jacob Palis
- Minister of Justice: Marco Aurélio Mello
- Minister of Treasury: Nelson Barbosa, and Joaquim Levy
- Neuroscientist: Suzana Herculano-Houzel
- Physicist: Carlos Bertulani, Fernando de Souza Barros, Marcelo Gleiser, Belita Koiller, José Leite Lopes, and Herch Moysés Nussenzveig
- Political commentator: Villas-Bôas Corrêa;
- Politicians: Osvaldo Aranha, Índio da Costa, Moreira Franco, and Carlos Lacerda
- Writers: Jorge Amado, Evandro Lins e Silva, Rubem Fonseca, and Clarice Lispector, Leandro Müller, Marques Rebelo, and Mário Furley Schmidt,
Notable UFRJ Alumni

Jorge Amado, writer

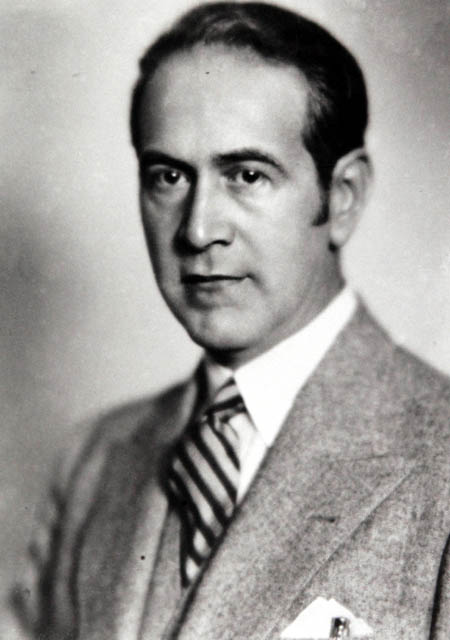
Oswaldo Aranha, politician, diplomat and statesman

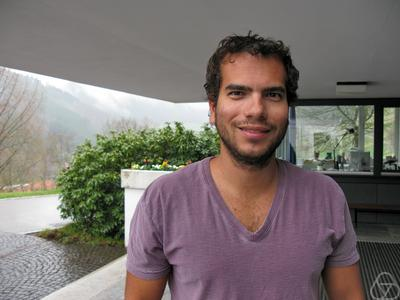
Artur Ávila, Fields Medal-winning mathematician

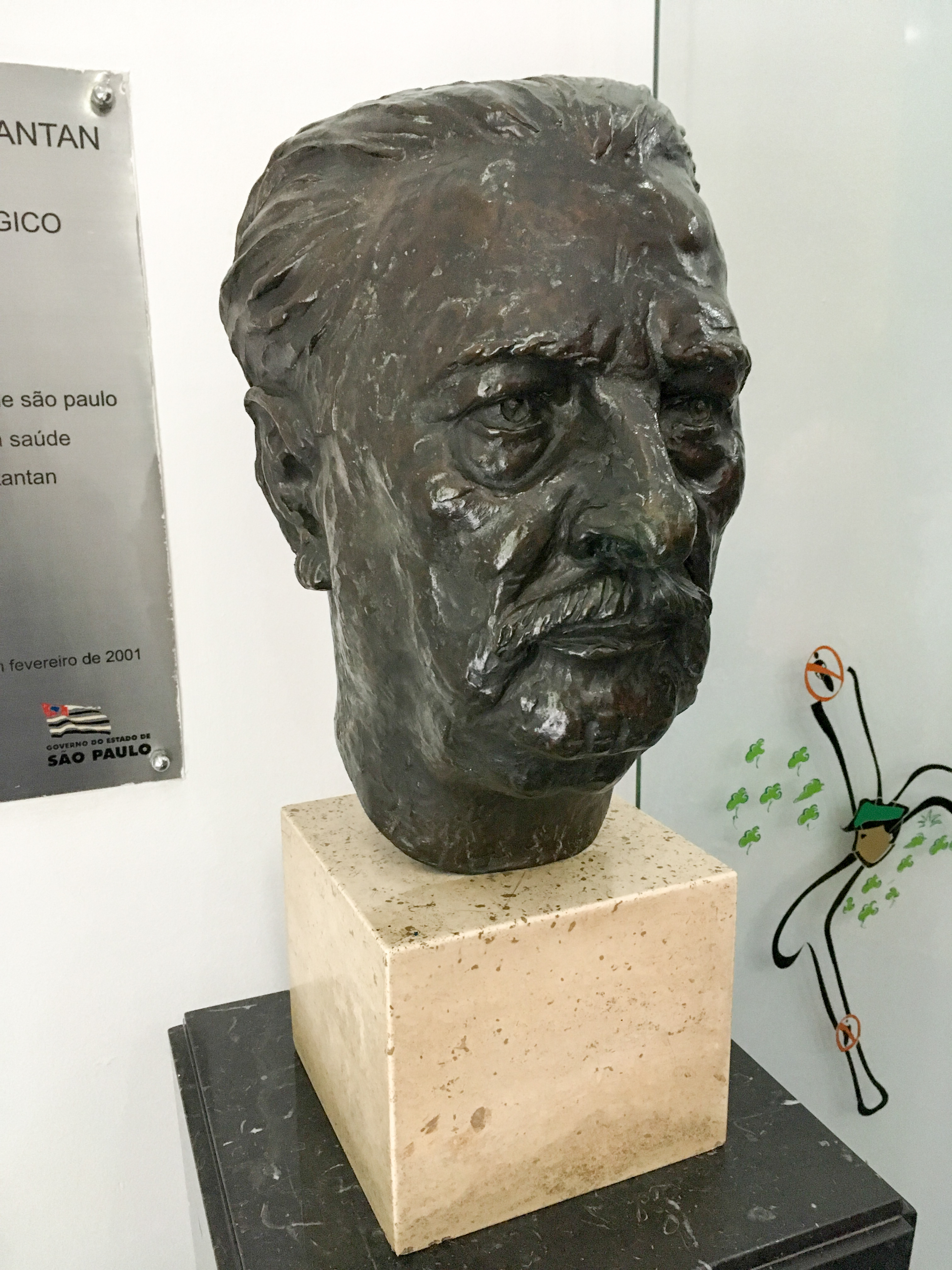
Vital Brazil, physician, biomedical scientist and immunologist. Discoverer of the polyvalent anti-ophidic serum

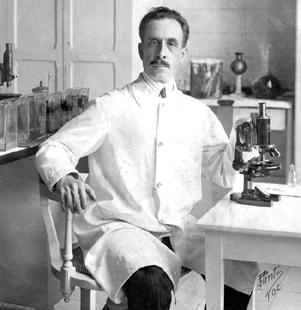
Carlos Chagas, doctor, discoverer of the Chagas disease

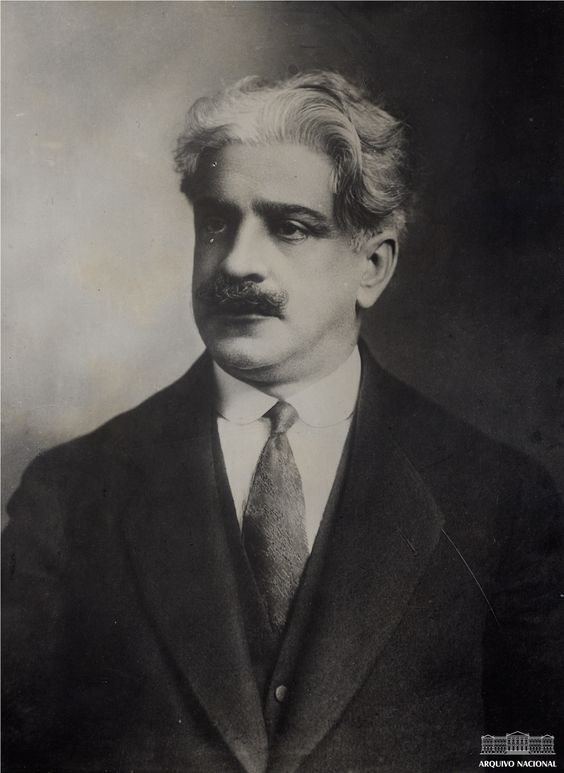
Oswaldo Cruz, physician, public health officer and the founder of the Oswaldo Cruz Institute. Former member of the Brazilian Academy of Literature

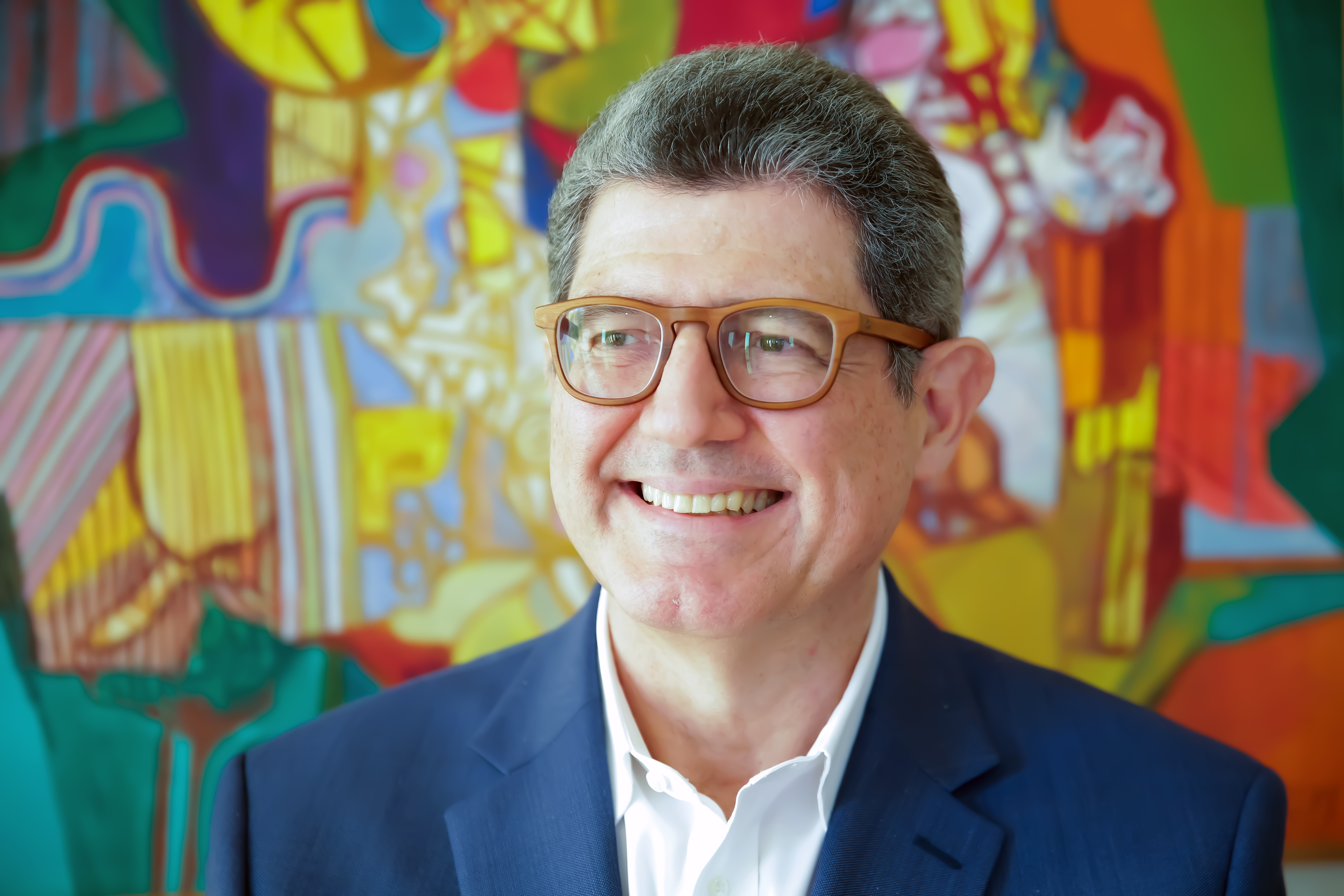
Joaquim Levy, Finance Minister of Brazil

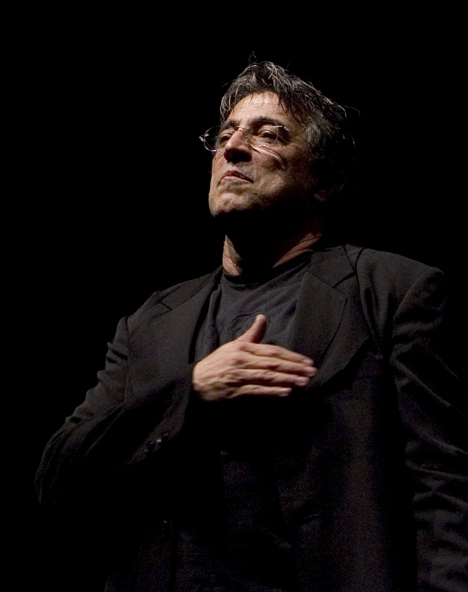
Ivan Lins, Latin Grammy-winning musician

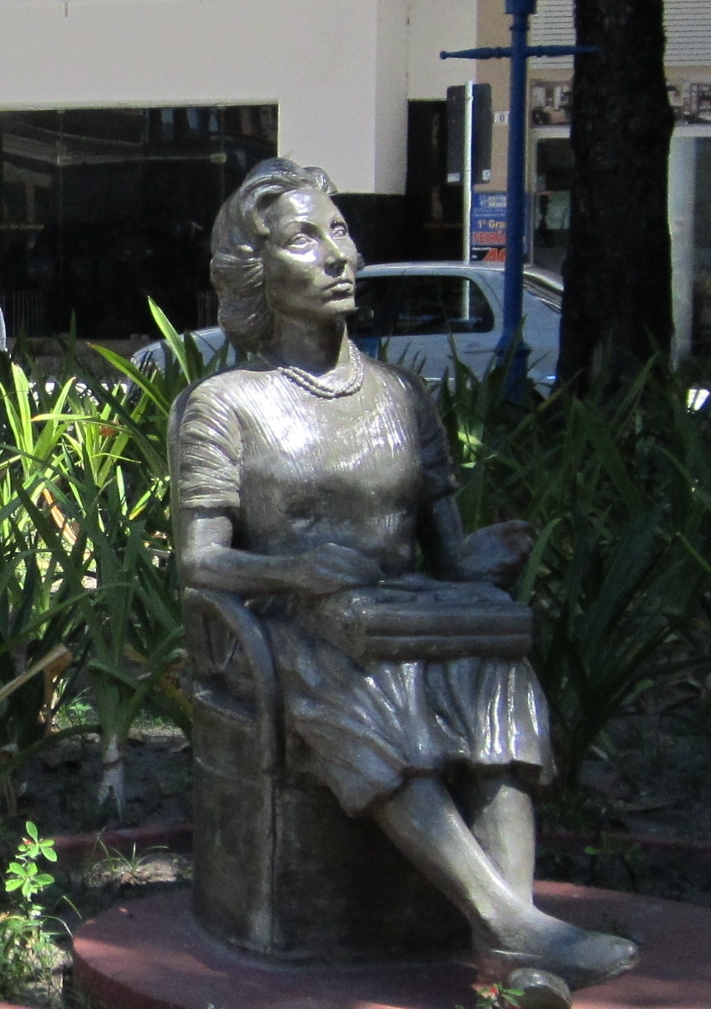
Clarice Lispector, writer

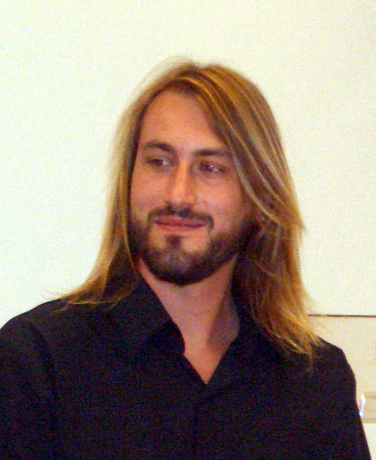
Leandro Müller, writer and editor.

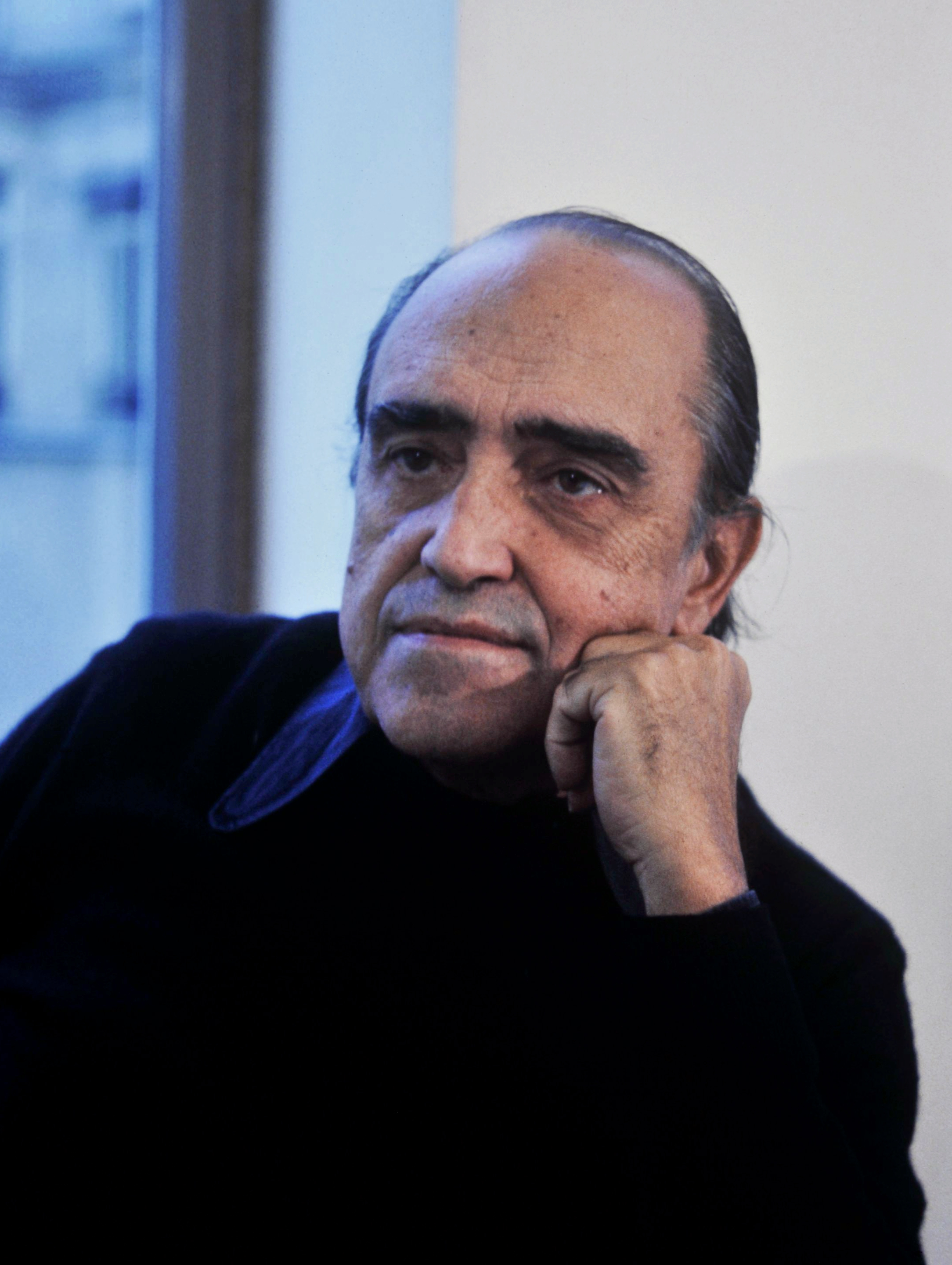
Oscar Niemeyer, architect

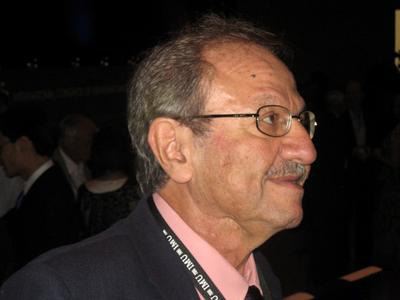
Jacob Palis, Legion of Honor and Balzan Prize-winning mathematician and professor

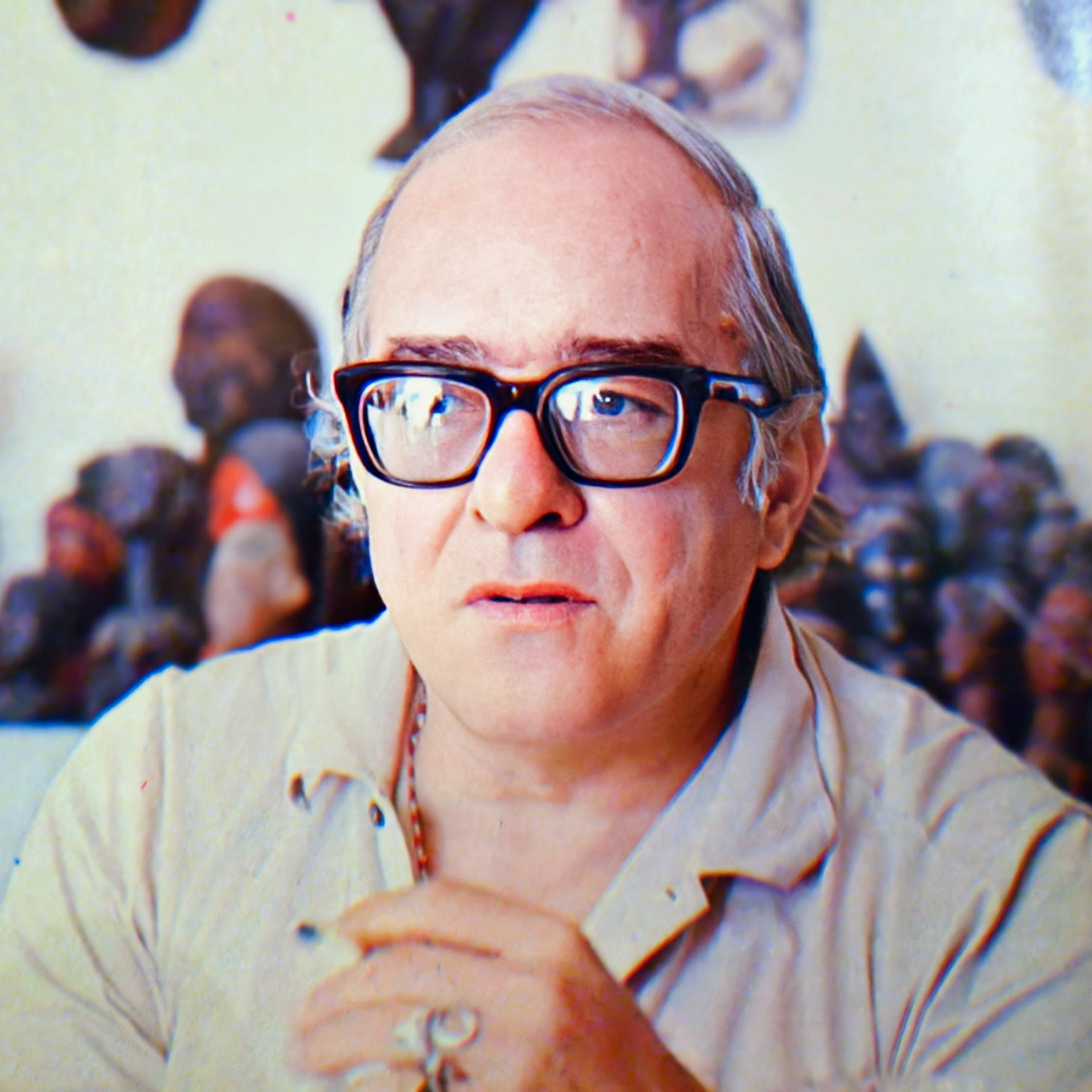
Vinícius de Moraes, Diplomat, writer, and lyricist

=== Student unions ===
Students are formally represented by the "Diretório Central dos Estudantes Mário Prata" (Mário Prata Central Student Directory, or DCE), which was founded in 1930 - preceding even the National Student Union (UNE, 1937). The entity remained influential until its shutdown by the military regime of 1964–85, when dozens of union leaders, including student and then-president of DCE Mario de Souza Prata, were murdered. In the late-1970s, given a gradual political opening, academic centers such as the DCE were given permission to function once again. Among the students that participated in the DCE's reactivation are Mário Furley Schimidt and some member of popular Brazilian comedy show Casseta & Planeta, like Marcelo Madureira, Beto Silva and Hélio de la Peña.

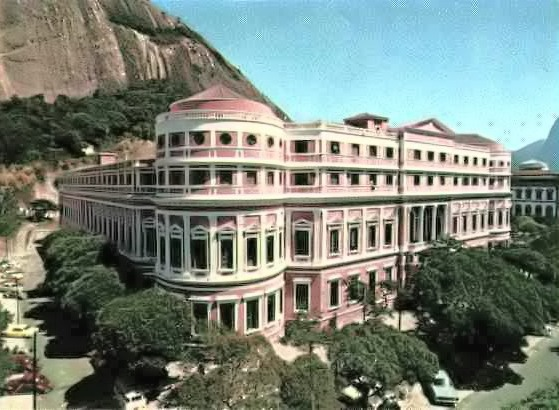
Building in which the College of Medicine operated until 1973, at "Praia Vermelha" (Red Beach).

To the young students who, at dawn of September 23rd, 1968, in the National College of Medicine building, dared to resist the police forces of the military regime. The episode known as "Massacre da Praia Vermelha" is one of the most important events of the constant fight for academic autonomy. To them, our deepest admiration.

— "Conselho Universitário" (University Council), resolution of 08/24/2006.

Besides the DCE, minor academic centers (CAs) act as students representative organs for each course: the Carlos Chagas Academic Center for the College of Medicine, the Polytechnic School Academic Center of Engineering, the Cândido de Oliveira Academic Center for the College of Law Studies, the Max Planck Academic Center for the Institute of Physics and the Academic Directory for the School of Chemistry, to cite the most notable.

The infamous episode known as "Massacre da Praia Vermelha" (Red Beach Massacre) was a hallmark the history of Brazilian student unions. At dawn of September 23, 1968, squads from the military government invading the old facility of then-National College of Medicine and savagely beat all students sheltered there. There was also massive depredation of public patrimony, as the action disenabled several of the college's laboratories and administrative sectors. Around 600 students were gathered to protest against the government's arbitrary and oppressive actions (ex.: the shutdown of DCE and UNE, the increase in meal prices) and to vindicate the release of Law student Rodrigo Lima, arrested for 35 days in the "Batalhão de Guardas do Exército" (Army Squad Battalion).

== Technological Park of Rio ==
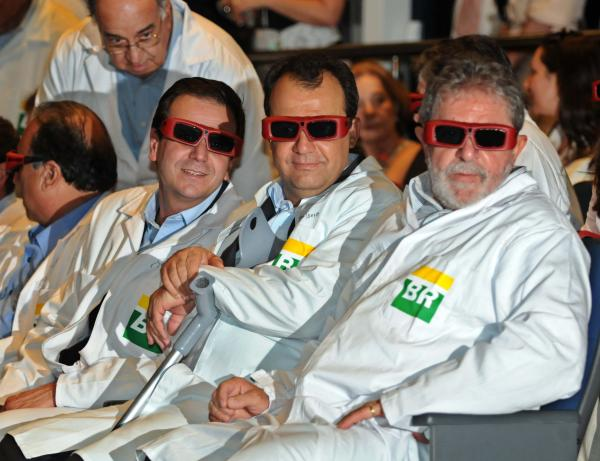
Former president of Brazil Luiz Inácio Lula da Silva, ex-governor of Rio de Janeiro state Sérgio Cabral Filho, and mayor of Rio Eduardo Paes visiting the CENPES.

The Parque Tecnológico do Rio (Technological Park of Rio) is also located in College City. It is a technopole geared towards research in energy, oil, and gas. In partnership with Petrobras, UFRJ intends to convert an area of 350 000 m^{2} into the world's largest oil-related technological research center, given that exploration and oil extraction from the recently discovered pre-salt layer fields is in urgent need of new, more affordable techniques. Intense private and state investments in the region, plus the high expectations it has generated, led it to be considered a Brazilian "Silicon Valley". The park gathers, among its main facilities:

- Leopoldo Américo Miguez de Mello Research Center (CENPES): founded in 1962 and managed by Petrobras, it is responsible for research and development (R&D) and for the company's basic engineering matters; it is the largest oil research pole in the Southern Hemisphere.
- Electric Energy Research Center (CEPEL): founded in 1974, it is part of group Eletrobrás and manages R&D related to the generation, transmission and distribution of electric energy. It is also the hemisphere's largest research center in the field.
- Mineral Technology Center (CETEM): founded in 1978 and under direct command by the Ministry of Science, Technology and Innovation (MCTI), it acts on the technological development concerning to minerals.
- General Electric Global Technological Center (GE): under construction, with inauguration planned to 2014. Until then, General Electric operates in the facilities of the Center of Excellence in Communication and Information Technology (CETIC).
- Alberto Luiz Coimbra Institute of Post-Graduation and Research in Engineering (COPPE): UFRJ's supplementary organ, it is Latin America's largest research and learning center of engineering. Also notable for owning the world's largest (volume terms) and deepest oceanic tank, which is used to simulate sea-life conditions.

Additionally, there is the Center of Excellence in Natural Gas (CEGN), the Institute of Nuclear Engineering (IEN), the Nucleus of Ecosystem Recovery Technologies (NUTRE) and a virtual reality center linked to the Laboratory of Computational Engineering Methods (LAMCE). Among the corporations with research units established in the Technological Park or in other spots of College City are: L'Oréal, Siemens, Usiminas, Schlumberger, Baker Hughes, FMC Technologies, Repsol YPF, Halliburton and Tenaris Confab. Public biddings for the construction of new research centers and commercial tower, all capable of supporting one hundred new more enterprises, are currently under request. The Park project has also attracted over 200 small or medium-sized companies to its centers, resulting in higher stakes for its innovational potential.

== Projects ==
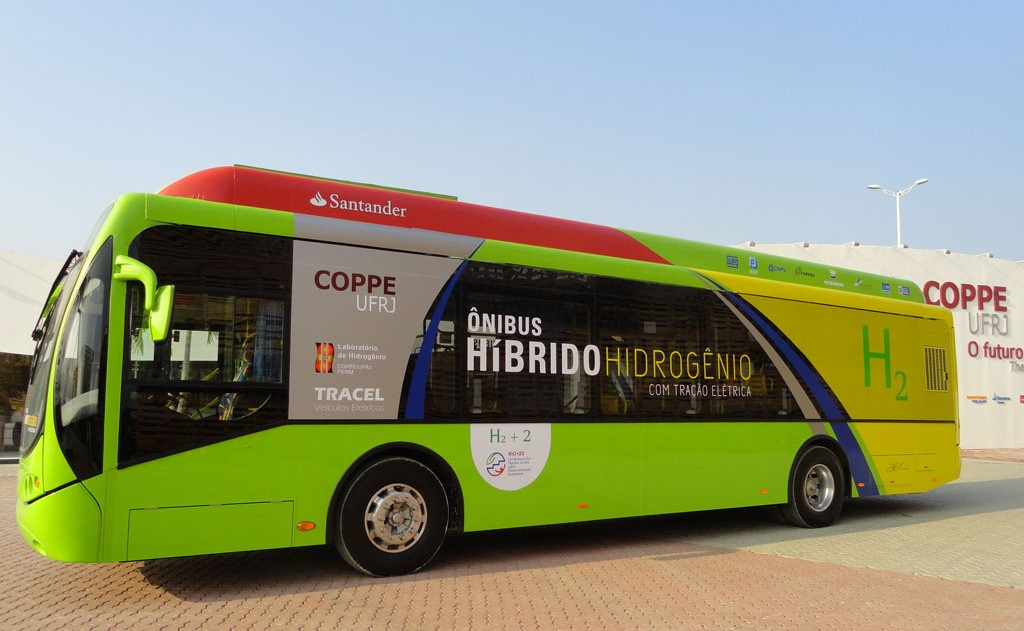
H2+2 project, a hybrid hydrogen bus with electric traction developed by the Alberto Luiz Coimbra Institute of Post-Graduation and Research in Engineering (COPPE) and exhibited at Rio+20 conference.

=== UFRJ Newspaper ===
The "Jornal da UFRJ" (UFRJ Newspaper) is a monthly publication by the General Superintendence of Social Communication. It has been on circulation since 2003, covering subjects of academic interest and government affairs. It is available both on print and digitally, with 25 000 copies being distributed across the universities many campuses.

=== UFRJ Sea ===
The "UFRJ Mar" (UFRJ Sea) was developed along Rio de Janeiro's coastline and comprehends several fields, from physical education and engineering to biological sciences and geosciences. The project relies on one of Brazil's most complex set of R&D laboratories in maritime and coastal studies.

=== Getting to Know the UFRJ ===
The "Conhecendo a UFRJ" (Getting to Know the UFRJ) is a two-day yearly event that takes place at College City, when high-school students have lectures about the institution, tour through its main campus and get to know its academic routine and student life. As of 2010, on its eighth edition, approximately 14 000 students participated in the event.

=== Plant Waves ===
Developed by COPPE with Government of Ceará supporting Pecém Wave Power Plant is the first in Latin America and places Brazil in a select group of countries with knowledge to extract electrical energy from sea waves. Factory with 100% Brazilian technology, is located 60 km from Fortaleza in the breakwater of the Port of Pecém. The project of researchers from COPPE underwater Technology Laboratory is designed in modules which allows the expansion of the capacity of the plant.

=== MagLev Cobra ===
The Maglev Cobra is a levitation train developed at the UFRJ (Federal University of Rio de Janeiro) by Coppe (Alberto Luiz Coimbra Institute of Graduate Studies and Research in Engineering) and the Polytechnic School by LASUP (Superconducting Applications Laboratory). The Brazilian train, as well as the German maglev floats on the tracks, with only friction with air during their displacement. Maglev Cobra based on levitation, moving without friction with the ground by a linear motor primary short. The vehicle has been designed towards a revolution in public transportation through high-tech, non-polluting way, energy efficient and affordable to large urban centers.

The deployment cost of Maglev Cobra is significantly lower than the subway, getting to cost only one-third of this. Its operating normal speed will be within a range of 70 to 100 km/h, compatible to the subway and ideal for urban public transport.

=== LabOceano ===
Able to reproduce the main features of the marine environment and simulate phenomena occurring in water depths greater than 2000 meters, LabOceano is a strategic technological support for Brazil, which has more than 90% of its oil reserves concentrated at sea, and for the oil and shipping industries. The ocean tank holds 23 million liters of water and its height corresponds to an eight-story building. Today, only two facilities in the world exist with similar characteristics to the tank designed by COPPE researchers: the Marintek, Norway, 10 meters, and Marin, Holland, 10.5 meters.

== Institutions ==
- Law School
- Museu Nacional (National Museum)
- Casa da Ciência (House of Science)
- CAp UFRJ (Laboratory School)

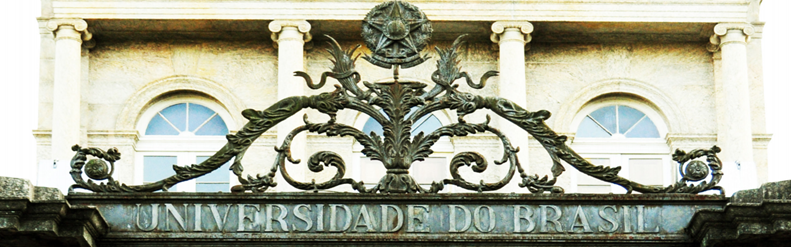
University Palace gateway.

== See also ==
- Brazil University Rankings
- Education in Brazil
- List of federal universities of Brazil
- Universities and Higher Education in Brazil
