= Gilberto Velho =

Brazilian anthropologist (1945–2012)

Gilberto Cardoso Alves Velho (May 15, 1945 – April 14, 2012) was a Brazilian anthropologist and professor. A pioneer in urban anthropology in his country, he studied complex society, generation, individualism, subcultures, deviance, and drug use. In 2000, he was awarded the Grand Cross of the National Order of Scientific Merit.

== Biography ==
Born in Rio de Janeiro, he studied social sciences at the old National Faculty of Philosophy, graduating in 1968. In 1970, he completed a master's degree in social anthropology at the Institute of Philosophy and Social Sciences of the Federal University of Rio de Janeiro with a thesis entitled A utopia urbana: um estudo de ideologia e urbanização, oriented by Shelton H. Davis. The following year, he specialized in urban anthropology and complex societies at the University of Texas at Austin. He was influenced by Erving Goffman, Anselm Strauss, William Foote Whyte, and Gilberto Freyre.

In 1975, he obtained a doctorate in human sciences under Ruth Cardoso at the Faculty of Philosophy, Languages and Human Sciences of the University of São Paulo, presenting the thesis Nobres e anjos: um estudo de tóxicos e hierarquia, later published as a book. Over the course of his academic career, he taught at the National Museum of Brazil and at the Federal University of Rio de Janeiro, having also presided the Brazilian Association of Anthropology. In 2000, he became a member of the Brazilian Academy of Sciences.
