= Juscelino Kubitschek bridge =

Juscelino Kubitschek Bridge
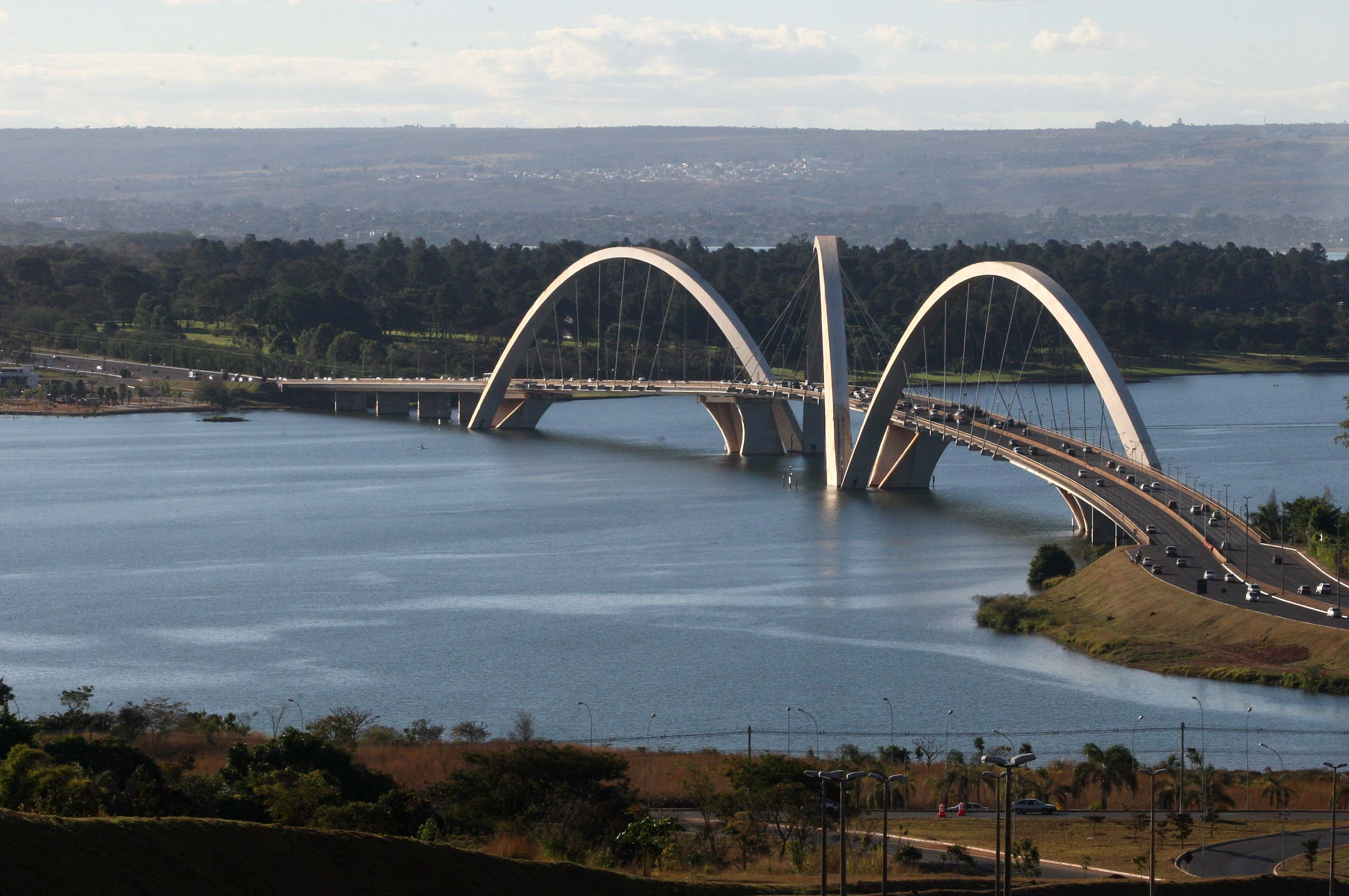
- View of Juscelino Kubitschek Bridge.
- Coordinates: 15°49′25″S 47°49′46″W
- Carries: vehicular, bicycle, pedestrian traffic
- Crosses: Lake Paranoá
- Locale: Brasília, Federal District (Brazil), Brazil
- Official name: Ponte Presidente Juscelino Kubitschek
- Maintained by: Governo do Distrito Federal

Characteristics
- Design: asymmetric arch bridge with suspended deck
- Total length: 1,200 metres (3,900 ft)
- Width: 24 metres (79 ft)
- Height: 60 metres (200 ft)
- Longest span: 240 metres (790 ft)
- Clearance above: 18 metres (59 ft)
- Clearance below: 18 metres (59 ft)

History
- Designer: Alexandre Chan and Mário Vila Verde
- Construction start: 2000
- Construction end: 2002
- Opened: 2002

Location
- Interactive map of Juscelino Kubitschek Bridge

Juscelino Kubitschek Bridge (Portuguese: Ponte Juscelino Kubitschek), commonly called Ponte JK (English: JK Bridge), is a steel and concrete arch bridge across Lake Paranoá in Brasília, Brazil. It connects the eastern shore of the lake – where Lago Sul, Paranoá and Brasília International Airport are located – to Brasília's city center, via the Monumental Axis. Opened to traffic on December 15, 2002, its distinctive silhouette quickly became a Brasília landmark.

The bridge is named after President Juscelino Kubitschek, who served from 1956 to 1961 and is generally considered the main political figure to have supported the construction of the planned city of Brasília. It was designed by architect Alexandre Chan and structural engineer Mário Vila Verde.

== Description ==
The bridge structure is 1,200 metres (3,900 ft) long, 24 metres (79 ft) wide and has two three-lane carriageways in each direction and walkways fitted with guard-rails on either for cyclists and pedestrians, each 1.5 metres (4.9 ft) wide, and three 240 metres (790 ft) spans.

The main span structure has four supporting pillars standing on the Lake Paranoá lakebed; and the deck weight is supported by three 200-foot-tall (61 m) asymmetrical steel arches that crisscross diagonally.

The decks are suspended by steel cables alternating at each side of the deck, interlacing in a twisted plane. The entire structure has a total length of 1,200 metres (3,900 ft), and was completed at a cost of US$56.8 million.

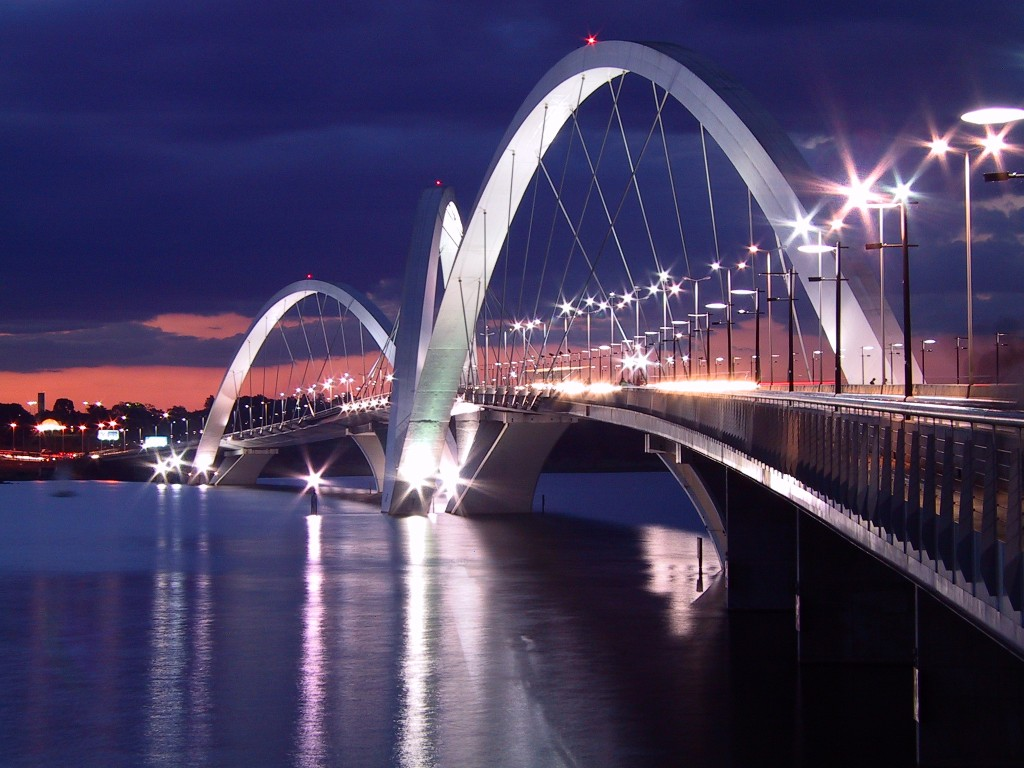
JK Bridge at dusk

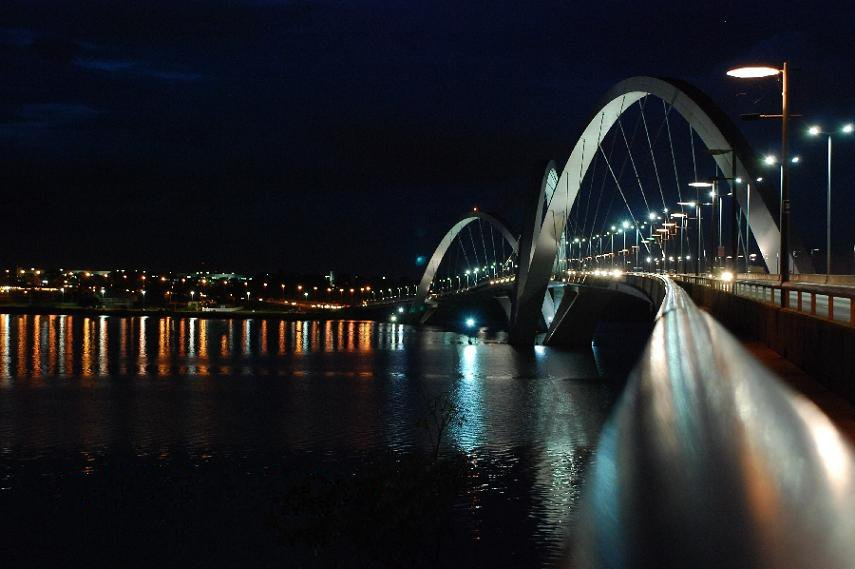
JK Bridge at night

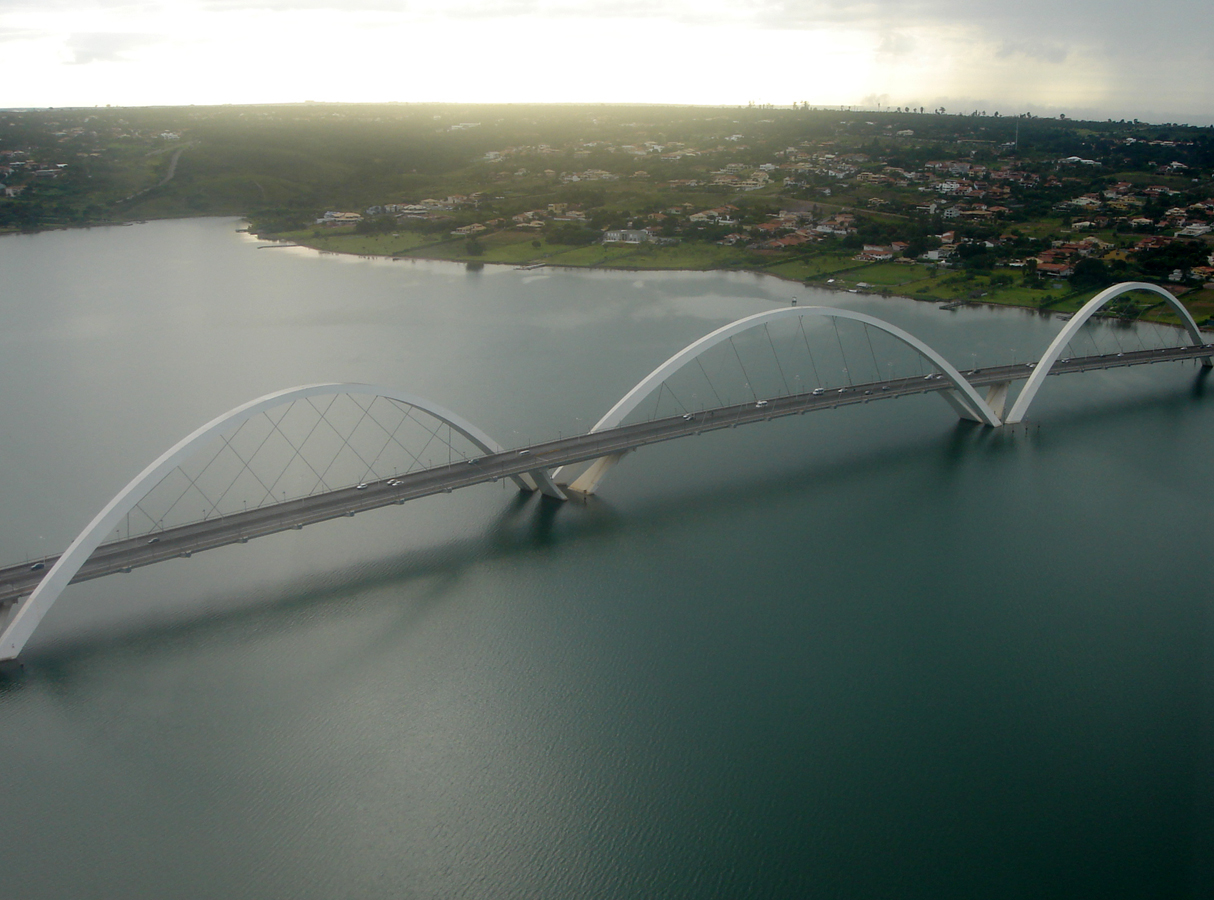
Aerial view of the bridge

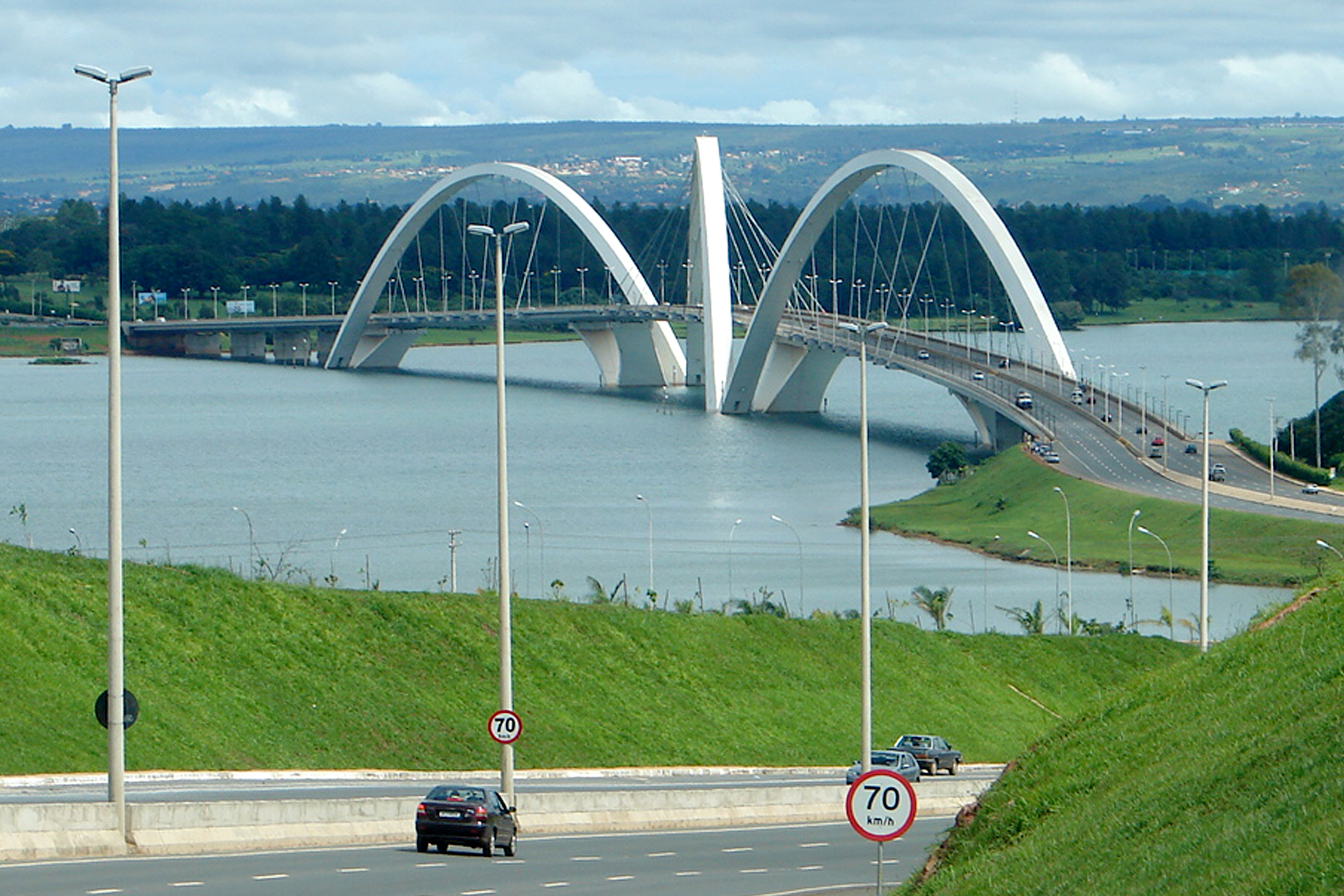
Approach to the bridge from its eastern shore

== Awards ==
Alexandre Chan received the Gustav Lindenthal Medal for the bridge's project at the 2003 International Bridge Conference in Pittsburgh. This medal is awarded "for a single, recent outstanding achievement showing harmony with the environment, aesthetic merit and successful community participation".

The bridge was also awarded the 2003 Premio Abcem (ABCEM Award) for "Best Steel Work of the Year, Bridges and Highway Overpasses Category", granted by the Brazilian Metal Construction Association (Associação Brasileira da Construção Metálica, ABCEM).
