= The COPPEAD Graduate School of Business =

Graduate school of business in Brazil

- Instituto de Pós-Graduação e Pesquisa em Administração
- Type: Business school, public, federal
- Established: 1973 (53 years ago)
- Parent institution: Universidade Federal do Rio de Janeiro (Federal University of Rio de Janeiro)
- Location: Rio de Janeiro, RJ, Brazil; 22°51′36″S 43°13′07″W
- Campus: Cidade Universitária
- Website: www.coppead.ufrj.br
- (logo of the UFRJ Universidade Federal do Rio de Janeiro (Federal University of Rio de Janeiro))
- Location in Brazil

The COPPEAD Graduate School of Business – Federal University of Rio de Janeiro (Portuguese: Instituto de Pós-Graduação e Pesquisa em Administração, Universidade Federal do Rio de Janeiro), also known as COPPEAD, is a business school founded in 1973 in Rio de Janeiro, Brazil.

Located at the COPPEAD building in Ilha do Fundão (Cidade Universitária) campus of the Federal University of Rio de Janeiro (UFRJ), COPPEAD has graduated more than 7,000 managers, 1,300 masters and 60 doctoral candidates in business-specialization courses. COPPEAD is the only business school both associated with a Brazilian public university and with an international accreditation.

The Master of Business Administration (MBA) program, public and tuition-free, is the only one in Latin America ranked in 2014 among the world's top 100, according to the Financial Times Global MBA Ranking.

== History ==
COPPEAD is a business school founded in 1973 in Rio de Janeiro, Brazil. The idea was conceived by a group of professors from the Production Engineering Program (Coppe/UFRJ), and as the result of a project to create a business school in Brazil.

During the first formative years, there was a considerable exchange of faculty with some of the international business schools in the United States and Europe.

In 1980, COPPEAD moved to its own building within the main UFRJ campus and, soon later, acquired the status of an autonomous institute within the structure of the university, thus becoming the COPPEAD Graduate School of Business.

== Campus ==
The COPPEAD campus is located within Ilha do Fundão at Cidade Universitária Campus of Federal University of Rio de Janeiro in Brazil.

== Accreditations, associations and initiatives ==
COPPEAD has been accredited by the EFMD Quality Improvement System (EQUIS) since 2006.

Furthermore, COPPEAD has been a Business Association of Latin American Studies (BALAS) member since 1995, a Latin American Council of Business Schools (CLADEA, according to its initials in Spanish) member since 1997, an Association to Advance Collegiate Schools of Business (AACSB) member since 2000, and a member of The European Foundation for Management Development (EFMD) since 2001.

In April 2008, COPPEAD took the initiative to create The Latin American Alliance of Business Schools (ALADEN, according to its initials in Spanish) in order to promote further integration via knowledge and strengthening of the bonds between Latin American business schools and the corporate world. The five founding members are business schools in their respective countries: CENTRUM, COPPEAD, the EGADE Business School, the Instituto de Estudios Superiores de Administración (IESA) and the University of Los Andes (UNIANDES).

== Graduate (full-time) programs ==
=== MBA program ===
COPPEAD's Master in Business Administration Program provides students with an integrated business perspective, following full-time MBA models adopted by the best North American and European business schools. The academic year is divided into four ten-week terms, with a week interval between terms, and it usually goes from February/March until December.

This two-year, tuition-free program is fully taught in English since 2014, with some electives courses offered in Portuguese, and requires full-time dedication on the part of the MBA students, who are afforded the opportunity to participate in the international exchange program. Selected students typically spend one semester in partner schools abroad. (For more information on this topic, see Exchange.)

==== Areas of focus ====
Students of this program may choose one of the following areas of concentration:

- Finance and Managerial Control
- Operations, Logistics and Technology
- Marketing and International Business
- Organizations, Strategy and Systems

==== MBA rankings ====
COPPEAD has been included in the Financial Times Global MBA Ranking (full-time MBA) among the top-100 business schools around the world.

COPPEAD's Financial Times MBA Rankings
Rank in 2014	79
Rank in 2013	66
Rank in 2012	51
Three-year average rank	65
Country	Brazil
Audit year	2013

==== Exchange ====
The full-time MBA also has an exchange program with internationally accredited partner schools in five continents. The Full-time MBA Exchange Program is an inter-institutional program that receives and sends students from and to its partner business schools, during the second semester of each year, usually from the end of July/August to December. The Exchange Program aims to offer participants a worldwide experience in an inter-cultural setting with top academic standards. The list of exchange partners include universities such as the Wharton School of the University of Pennsylvania, the IE Business School and the Hong Kong University of Science and Technology.

=== Doctoral Program ===
The Doctoral Program was launched in 1989, in order to enhance knowledge in the area of Administration and Business Management. The program is structured to complement the training of professionals in teaching, research and consulting areas, who have already great experience and are looking for an academic standard of excellence. Besides taking compulsory and elective courses, students must pass a qualifying examination in their concentration areas so they can be considered, in fact, candidates for a doctor's degree. The requirements for the degree are complemented by a research thesis, which is an original work in the field of interest of the candidate. This is a four-year program.

== Executive Education Programs ==
The Executive Education Programs offer Specialization Programs with a ten-month duration, one-day-a-week programs such as an (Executive MBA, Health Management, Marketing Management, Finance Management, and Logistics Management; Advanced Programs (post MBA) of medium-length (20 or 40 hour) in Finance, Marketing and Strategy; Professional Improvement Programs of 180 hours (10-month program) of Project Management, Retail Management and Service Management; Pre-experience Programs of 160 hours (10-month program) of International Management, Entrepreneurship, Finance, Marketing and Human Resources; and In-company Programs.

=== EMBA Rankings ===
COPPEAD has been included in 2014 in the Financial Times Global Executive MBA Ranking (EMBA) among the top-100 business schools around the world.

== Research centers ==
COPPEAD has eight research centers headed by faculty members. The teams are formed by students of the master and doctoral programs, undergraduate students, school's professors and external researchers, all of which work together in the COPPEAD's Research Space. Such centers are backed by external funding, including government agencies and private companies, through the research chairs. COPPEAD sees the chairs as an initiative for dialogue with institutions and as a way to establish bonds with the corporate reality. All research production in the centers is released to the public, whether through articles, conferences and/or books.

== People ==
=== Faculty ===
All faculty members at COPPEAD have a doctoral degree. The faculty has 42% and 19% female and international members, respectively.

=== Alumni ===
During 2013, the COPPEAD's MBA and EMBA composition of the student body was the following:

COPPEAD's MBA & EMBA students
Female students in the MBA (%)	40
International students in the MBA (%)	27
Female students in the EMBA (%)	28

From 2009 to 2012, the doctoral students presented the following profile:

COPPEAD's doctoral students
Age
Maximum	50
Mean	35
Minimum	24

Background

- Public Administration
- Education
- Business Management
- Political History
- Psychoanalytic Theory
- Economics
- Production Engineering
- Administration

== See also ==
- List of business schools
- List of universities in Brazil by state
- Universities and higher education in Brazil
