= Leandro Müller =

Brazilian writer (born 1978)

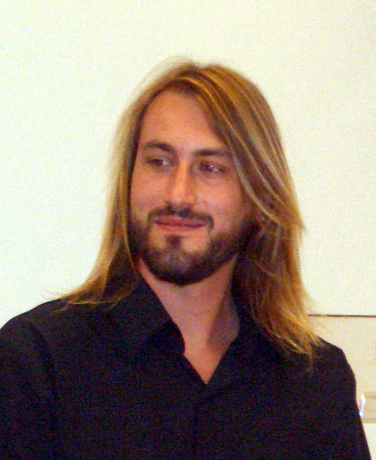
- Müller in Salamanca, Spain (2008)
- Born: November 14, 1978; Juiz de Fora, Minas Gerais, Brazil
- Occupation: Writer

Leandro Müller (born November 14, 1978) is a Brazilian writer. He has a double degree in Journalism and Advertising from the Federal University of Rio de Janeiro (Universidade Federal do Rio de Janeiro). Muller studied Philosophy at the State University of Rio de Janeiro (Universidade Estadual do Rio de Janeiro - Brazil) and at Porto University (Universidade do Porto, Portugal). He has been writing since 2004. He also worked as an editor in publishing.

His first novel, "O Código Aleijadinho" (Aleijadinho’s code), was published in 2006. This thriller is set in five different cities in the Brazilian state of Minas Gerais, a place that still has a colonial-period atmosphere. The novel’s plot presents some real Brazilian artists and historical characters from the independence movement, which was born in this region and was known as Inconfidência Mineira.

In 2008, Müller was awarded the Prémio Máster en Edición from the Spanish group of Santillana for his novel "Pequeño Tratado Hermético sobre Efectos de Superficie" (A small hermetic treaty about Effects of Surface) and published by Ediciones Universidad Salamanca, a Publishing House from the traditional University of Salamanca. This novel is introduced by the Spanish writer Enrique Vila-Matas.

== Works ==
- O Código Aleijadinho (Aleijadinho’s code) – published by Espaço e Tempo (Rio de Janeiro, 2006)
- Pequeño Tratado Hermético sobre Efectos de Superficie (A small hermetic treaty about Effects of Surface) – published by Ediciones Universidad Salamanca (Salamanca, 2008)

== Awards ==
- Honorable award in the poetry contest organized by the Student’s Association from Porto University (Portugal, 2007)
- Prémio Máster en Edición do Santillana Formación (Spain, 2008)
