= Ponte do Saber =

Cable-stayed bridge in Rio de Janeiro, Brazil

Bridge of Knowledge Ponte do Saber
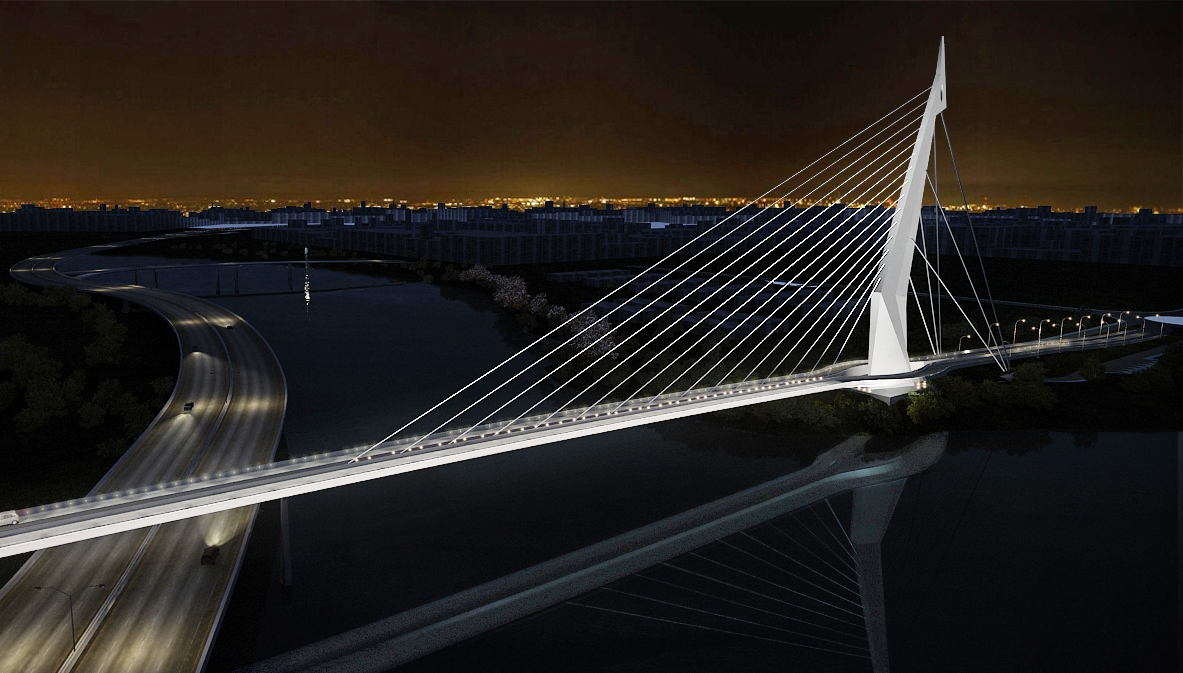
- Ponte do Saber at night
- Coordinates: 22°51′57″S 43°13′51″W

Characteristics
- Total length: 780 metres
- Width: 95.5 metres

History
- Architect: Alexandre Chan
- Opened: February 17, 2012

Location
- Interactive map of Bridge of Knowledge

Ponte do Saber ("Bridge of Knowledge") is a cable-stayed bridge in Rio de Janeiro, Brazil.

Designed by architect Alexandre Chan and completed in 2012, the bridge connects the Ilha do Fundão campus of the Federal University of Rio de Janeiro (UFRJ) to the southbound Red Line (Linha Vermelha) expressway that leads to downtown Rio de Janeiro. The bridge was inaugurated and opened to traffic on 17 of February 2012.
