= Alexandre Chan =

Brazilian architect

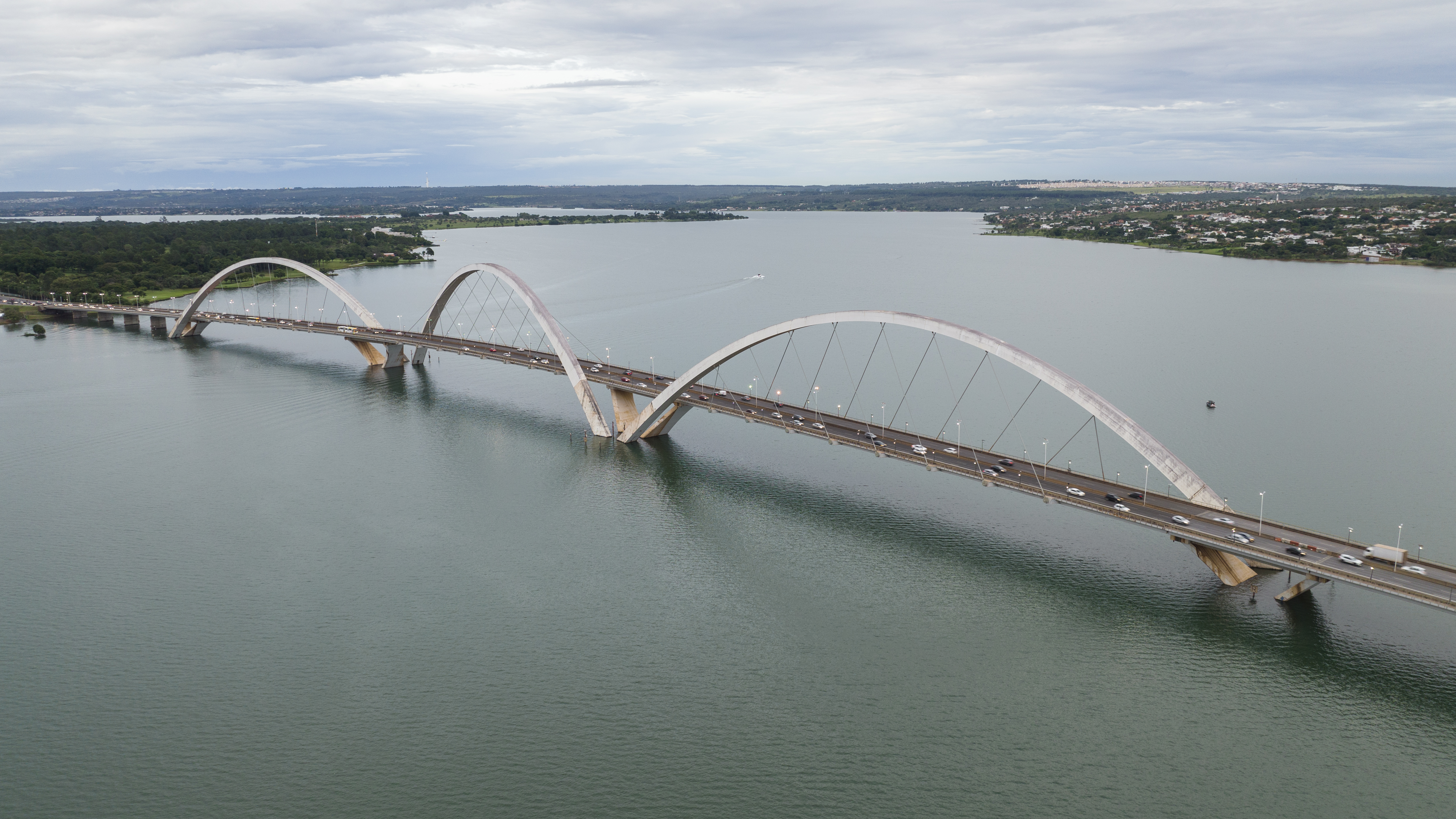
President Juscelino Kubitschek Bridge, Brasília

Alexandre Chan (born March 27, 1942) is a Brazilian architect best known for designing the President Juscelino Kubitschek Bridge in Brasília, Brazil with structural engineer Mario Vila Verde, and the Bridge of Knowledge in Rio de Janeiro. He has been described as "one of Brazil's leading architects".

Chan's idea for the President Juscelino Kubitschek Bridge was to create a landmark for the enjoyment of the community as much as to simply traverse a body of water. The bridge includes large arches that cross over the roadway midspan and drop on the opposite side of the roadway while radial cable stays "between the roadway and the underside of each arch form a sort of tunnel for travelers." The road itself is three lanes in each direction with a sidewalk on each side. The bridge won the Gustav Lindenthal Medal at the International Bridge Conference in 2003.

== Notable works ==
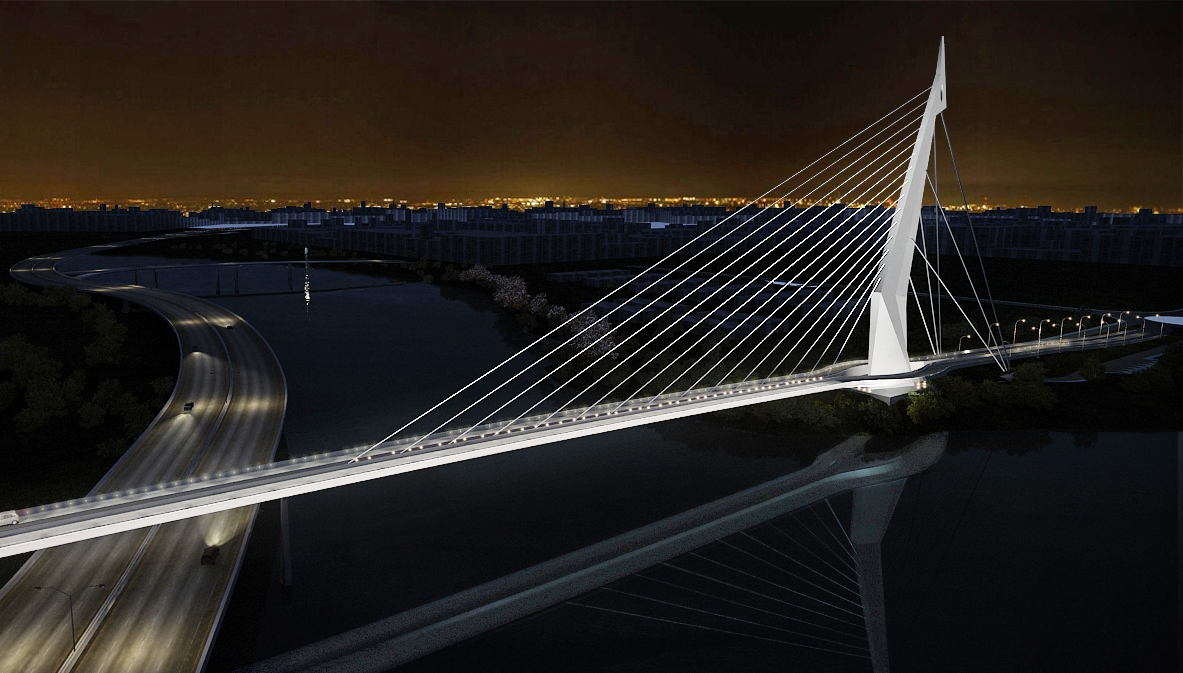
The Ponte do Saber (Bridge of Knowledge), Rio de Janeiro

- President Juscelino Kubitschek Bridge, Brasilia (2004)
- Bridge of Knowledge, Rio de Janeiro (2012)
- Rio Sul Complex, Shopping Center and Tower, Rio de Janeiro (1980)
