= Cenpes =

Brazilian research center unit

The Centro de Pesquisas Leopoldo Américo Miguez de Mello known as Cenpes is the unit of Research Center of Petrobras responsible for research and development (R & D) and basic engineering of the company. It was formed on 4 December 1963 and aims to provide technological solutions to anticipate and vision of innovation and sustainability for the company.

Currently under construction is the expansion of the current headquarters of Cenpes and that is the largest center of research on oil from the southern hemisphere.

== Operation ==
Cenpes aims to plan, coordinate, implement, promote and monitor the activities of R & D and basic engineering related to the oil industry and other energy sources. Besides these activities, Cenpes is responsible for:

- Establish and maintain relationships with the community of science and technology (S & T), by universities and research centers in the country;
- Provide technical assistance and perform centralized services in the areas of technical information and industrial property (trademarks and patents);
- Propose guidelines on technology and innovation to Petrobras.

=== Research and development ===
Cenpes carries out research and technological development in energy, fulfilling the needs of the areas of end-Petrobras: exploration, production and refining of oil and natural gas, in addition to research on renewable energy and sustainable development.

=== Basic engineering ===
The area of basic engineering is responsible for three major activities: the production of basic design (set of technical documents that define a fully operational unit and aims to hire the subsequent phases of development), technical evaluations and economic provision of assistance technique.

== See also ==
- Petrobras
- Petroleum
