= List of Brazilians =

Flag of Brazil

This is a list of Brazilians, people in some way notable that were either born in Brazil or immigrants to Brazil (citizens or permanent residents), grouped by their area of notability.

== Activists ==
- Chico Mendes (1944–1988), murdered rural leader and martyr of ecological movements in the Amazon
- Maria Tomásia Figueira Lima (1826–1902), aristocrat, abolitionist
- Nathercia da Cunha Silveira (1905–1993), suffragist, trade unionist and lawyer

== Actors ==
- Zola Amaro (1890–1944), operatic soprano
- Alice Braga (born 1983)
- Alinne Moraes (born 1982)
- Ana Paula Arósio (born 1975)
- Antônio Fagundes (born 1949)
- Dennis Carvalho (1947–2026)
- Bete Mendes (born 1949), actor/politician
- Betty Lago (1955–2015)
- Bruno Campos (born 1973)
- Bruna Lombardi (born 1952)
- Bruna Marquezine (born 1995)
- Carolina Dieckmann (born 1978)
- Cauã Reymond (born 1980)
- Daniel Benzali (born 1950)
- Daniele Suzuki (born 1977)
- Denise Fraga (born 1964)
- Dercy Gonçalves (1907–2008), artist
- Eliane Giardini (born 1952)
- Fernanda Montenegro (born 1929), Academy Award nominee
- Fernanda Torres (born 1965)
- Fábio Assunção (born 1971)
- Fábio Lago (born 1970)
- Gianfrancesco Guarnieri (1934–2006)
- Giovanna Antonelli (born 1976)
- Glória Menezes (born 1934)
- Grande Otelo (1915–1993)
- Guilherme Berenguer (born 1980)
- Hebe Camargo (1929–2012), TV presenter, singer, actress
- José Lewgoy (1920–2003)
- José Wilker (1944–2014)
- Juliana Didone (born 1984)
- Juliana Silveira (born 1980), actress/singer
- Lázaro Ramos (born 1978)
- Leonardo Villar (1923–2020)
- Lima Duarte (born 1930)
- Lucélia Santos (born 1957)
- Malu Mader (born 1966)
- Carmen Miranda (1909–1955), singer
- Marco Nanini (born 1948)
- Maria Flor (born 1983)
- Marília Pêra (1943–2015)
- Matheus Nachtergaele (born 1968)
- Miguel Falabella (born 1955)
- Morena Baccarin (born 1979)
- Murilo Benício (born 1971)
- Natália Guimarães (born 1984), Miss Brasil 2007, actress
- Oscarito (1906–1970)
- Paola Oliveira (born 1982)
- Paulo Autran (1922–2007)
- Paulo Betti (born 1952)
- Raul Cortez (1932–2006)
- Regina Duarte (born 1947)
- Renato Aragão (born 1935)
- Reynaldo Gianecchini (born 1972)
- Rodrigo Hilbert (born 1980)
- Rodrigo Santoro (born 1975)
- Ronald Golias (1929–2005), actor and comedian
- Selton Mello (born 1972)
- Sônia Braga (born 1950)
- Taís Araújo (born 1978)
- Marcos Winter (born 1966)
- Tarcisio Meira (1935–2021)
- Vera Fischer (born 1951)
- Wagner Moura (born 1976)
- Xuxa Meneghel (born 1963), actress, singer, TV host
- Leonardo Vieira (born 1964), actor

== Architects and urban planners ==
- Affonso Eduardo Reidy (1909–1964), architect and urban planner, reformer of Rio de Janeiro
- Alexandre Chan (born 1942)
- João Batista Vilanova Artigas (1915–1985), architect and professor
- Lina Bo Bardi (1914–1992), architect
- Lúcio Costa (1902–1998), architect and urban planner, creator of Brasília
- Oscar Niemeyer (1907–2012), architect of international renown, winner of the 1988 Pritzker Prize
- Paulo Mendes da Rocha (1928–2021), architect and professor, winner of the 2006 Pritzker Prize
- Roberto Burle Marx (1909–1994), architect and landscape designer
- Jaime Lerner (1937–2021), architect and urban planner
- Ruy Ohtake (1938–2021), architect
- Marcio Kogan (born 1952), architect
- Igor de Vetyemy (born 1981), architect and professor

== Artists (Visual arts) ==
=== Painters ===
- Alfredo Volpi (1896–1988)
- Almeida Júnior (1850–1899)
- Anita Malfatti (1889–1964)
- Arthur Timotheo da Costa (1882–1922)
- Cândido Portinari (1903–1962)
- Emiliano Di Cavalcanti (1897–1976)
- Iberê Camargo (1914–1994)
- José Pancetti (1902–1958)
- Lasar Segall (1891–1957)
- Manabu Mabe (1924–1997)
- Manoel da Costa Ataíde (1762–1830)
- Tarsila do Amaral (1886–1973)
- Vicente do Rego Monteiro (1899–1970)
- Victor Meirelles (1832–1903)

=== Sculptors ===
- Antonio Francisco Lisboa "O Aleijadinho" (1730–1814), Baroque sculptor
- Shirley Paes Leme (born 1955), printmaker, sculptor, and educator
- Sergio Rossetti Morosini, Brazilian American (born 1953), Contemporary sculptor
- Victor Brecheret (1894–1955)

=== Cartoonists ===
- Carlos Latuff (born 1968), political cartoonist
- Fábio Moon (born 1976)
- Gabriel Bá (born 1976)
- Henfil (1944–1988)
- Mauricio de Sousa (born 1935)
- Millôr Fernandes (1923–2012)
- Ziraldo (1932–2024)

=== Others ===
- Abraham Palatnik (1928–2020)
- Ana Maria Pacheco (born 1943), painter and sculptor
- Artur Barrio (born 1945)
- Cybèle Varela (born 1943), painter, mixed-media artist
- Hélio Oiticica (1937–1980), painter
- Lygia Clark (1920–1988)
- Lygia Pape (1927–2004)
- Moysés Baumstein (1931–1991), holographer, painter, film/video producer
- Naza (born 1955), painter, visual artist
- Oswaldo Goeldi (1895–1961), illustrator and engraver
- Sebastião Salgado (1944–2025), photographer
- Lucas Simões (born 1980) painter; concrete, paper, steel, foam materials

== Athletes ==
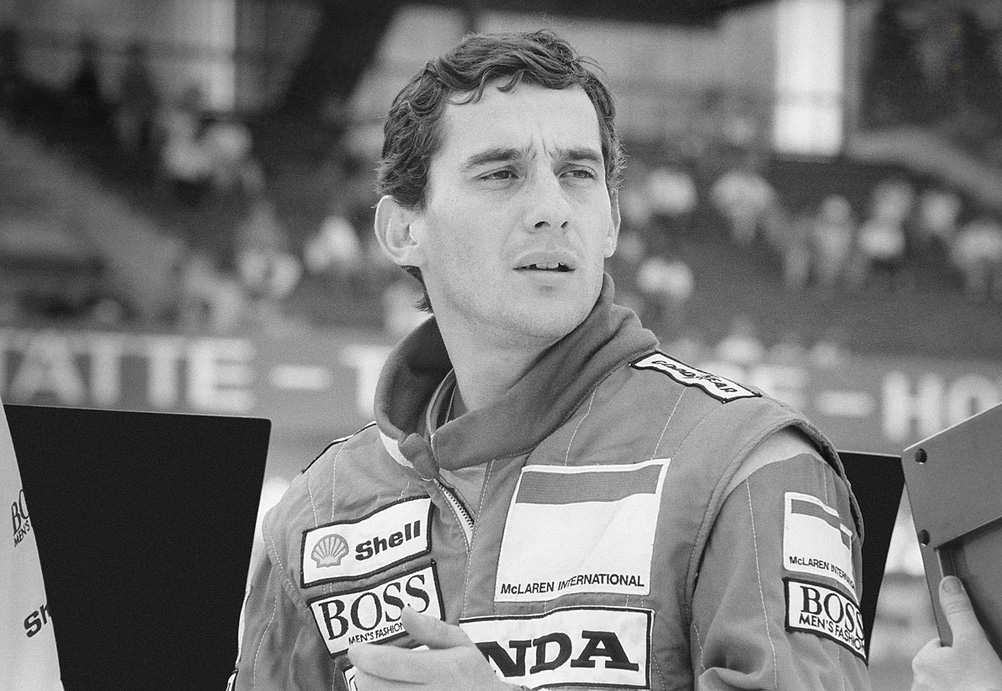
Ayrton Senna

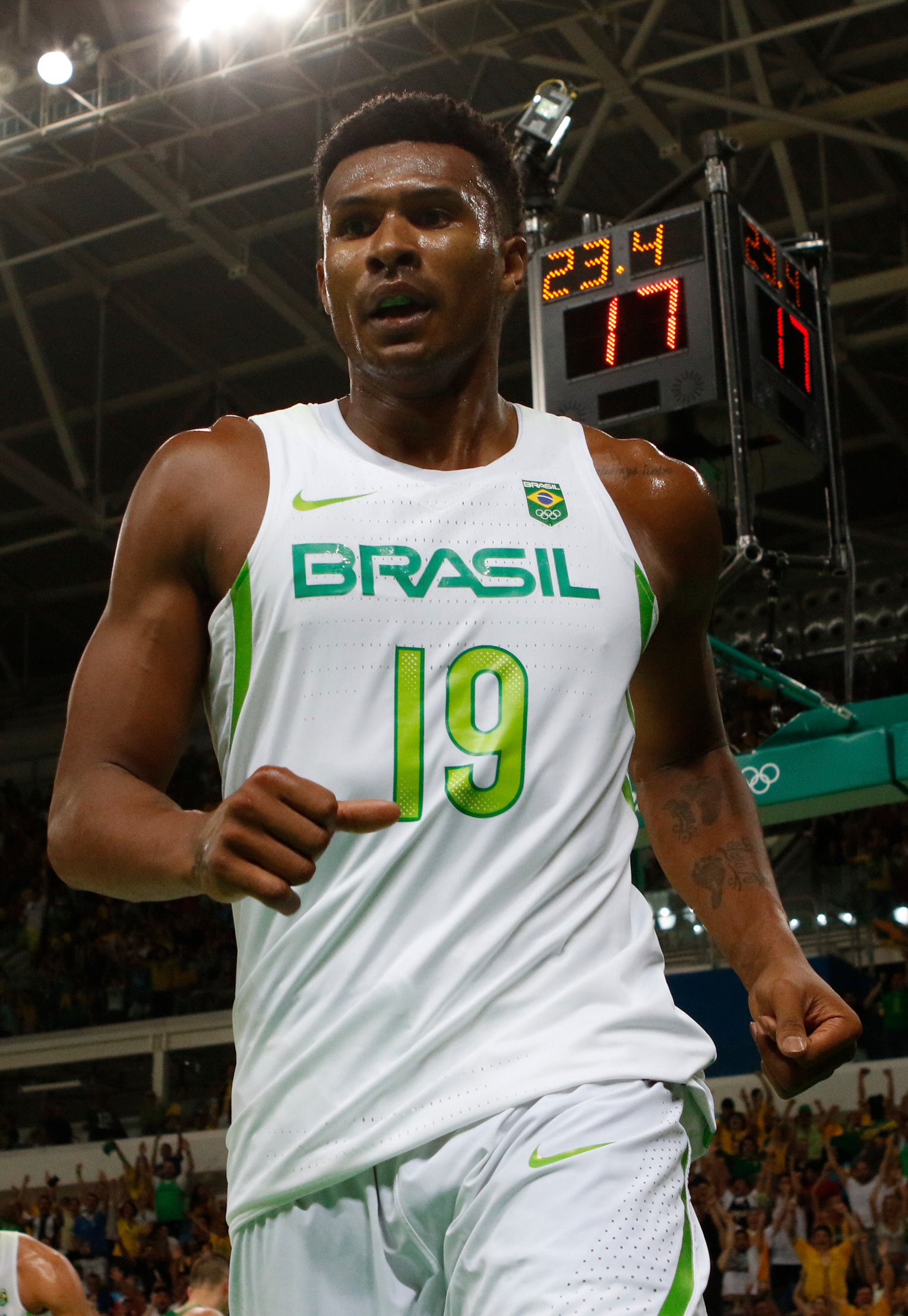
Leandro Barbosa

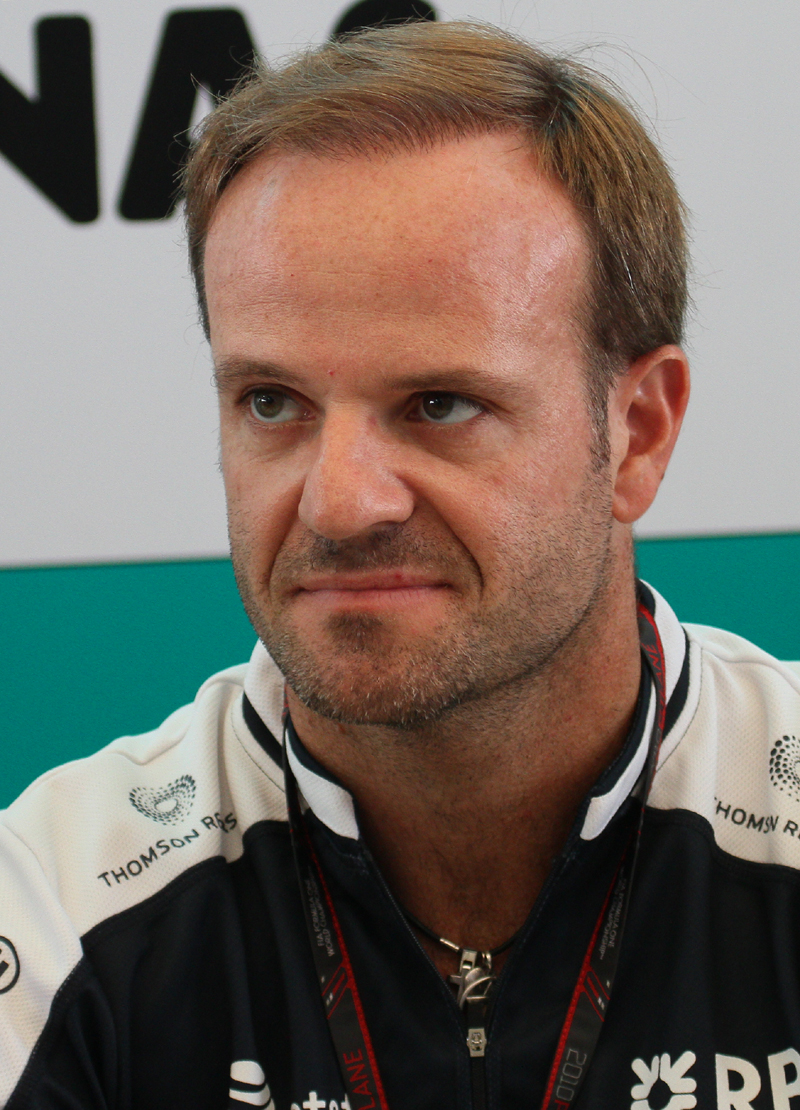
Rubens Barrichello

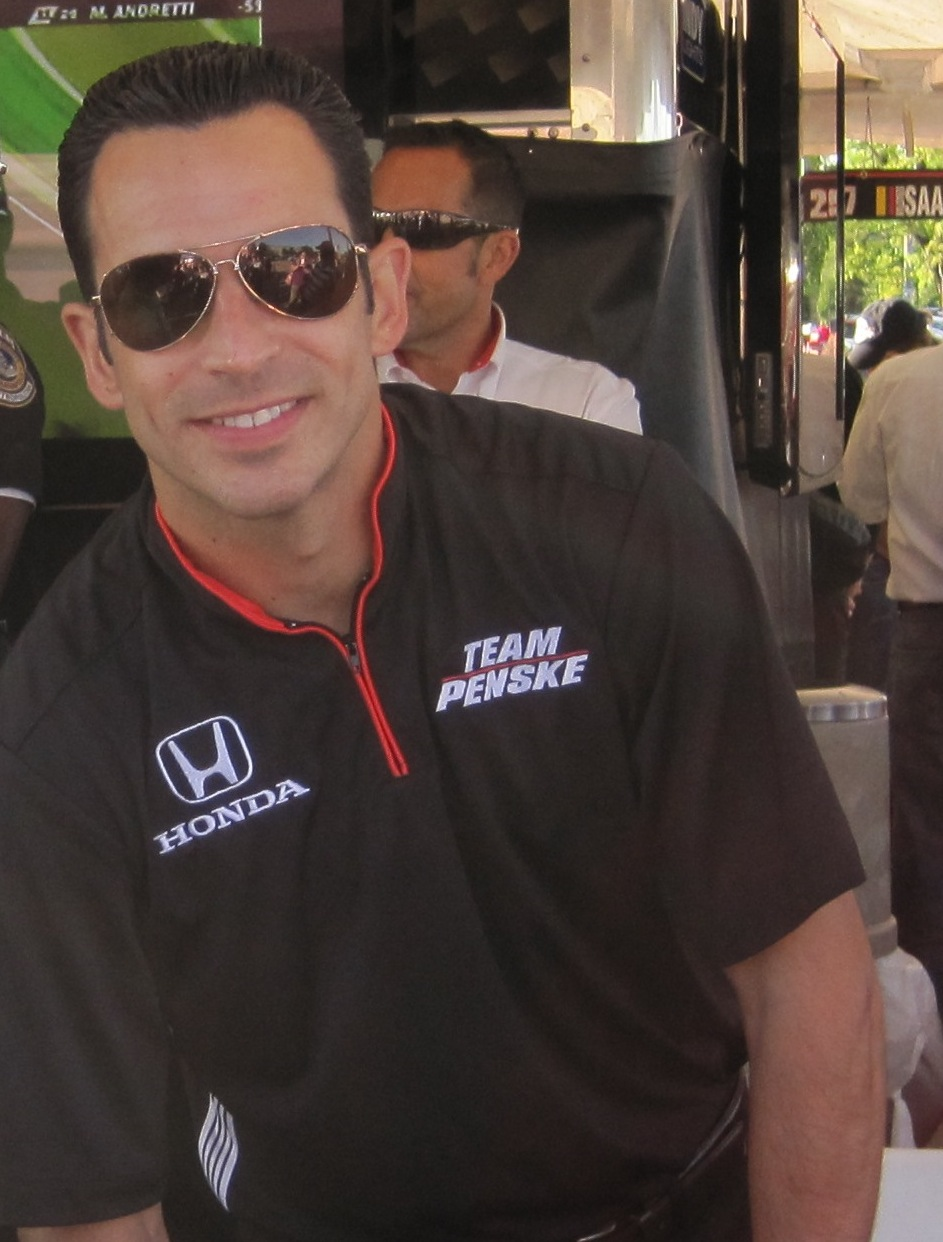
Hélio Castroneves

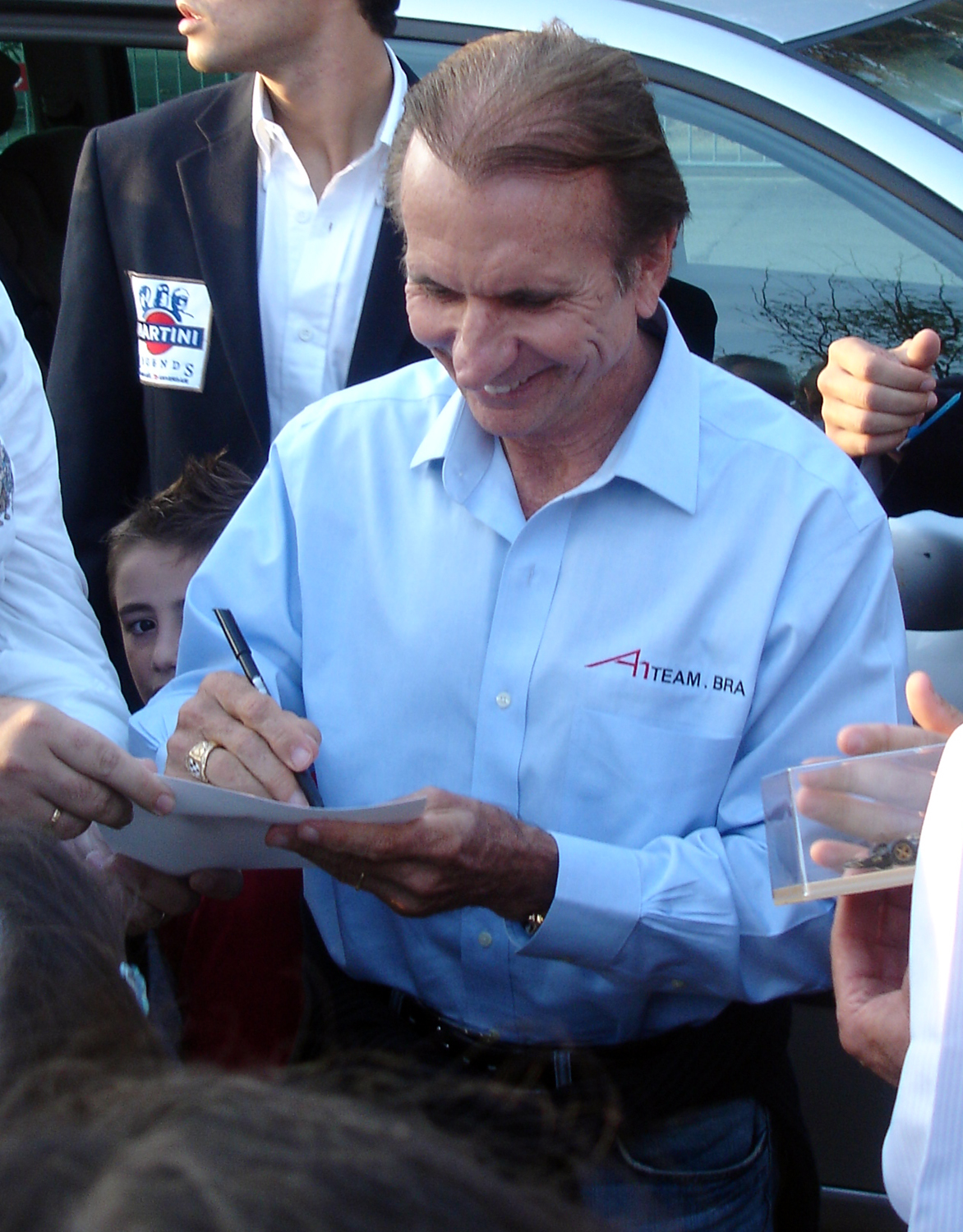
Emerson Fittipaldi

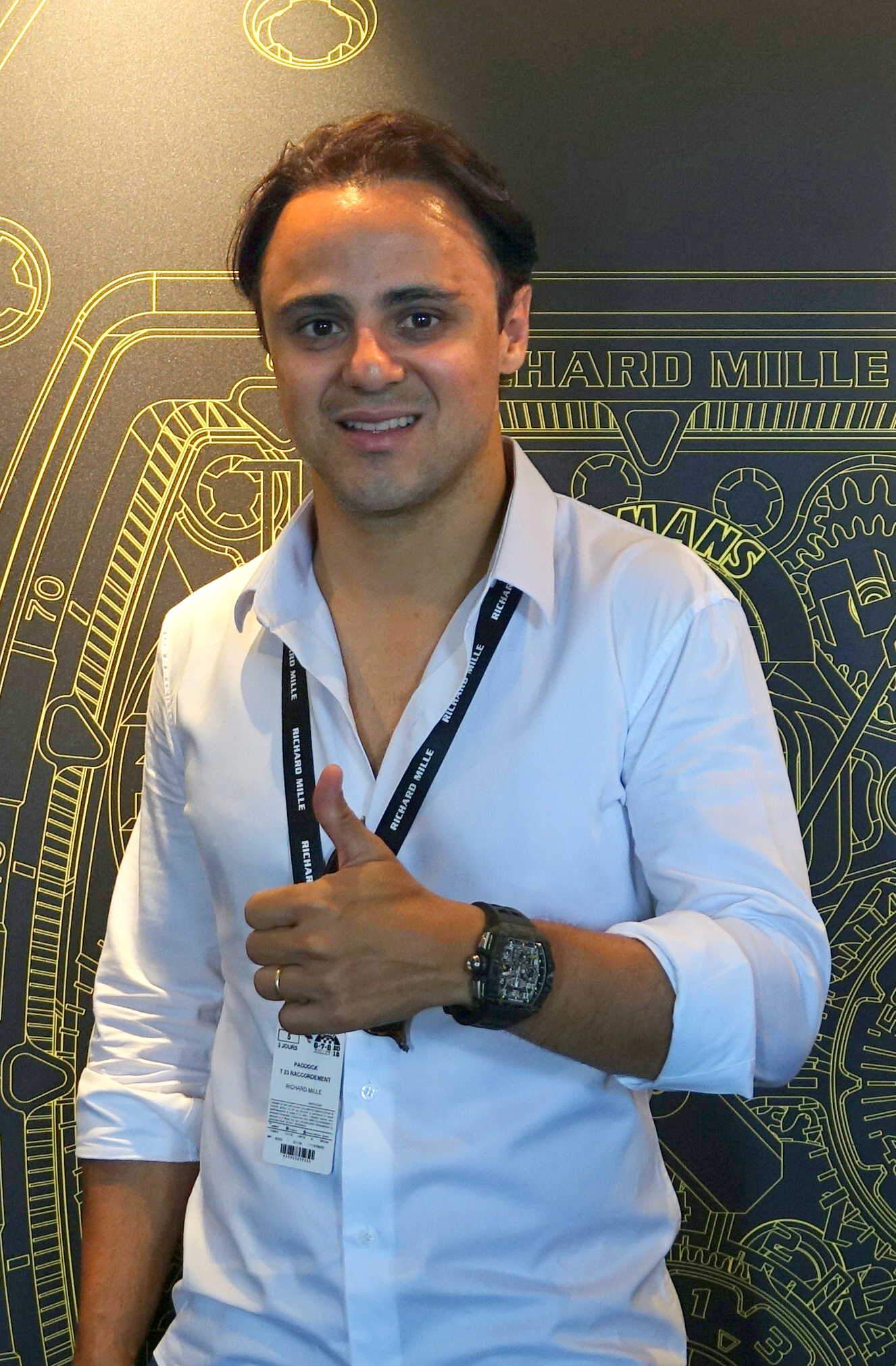
Felipe Massa

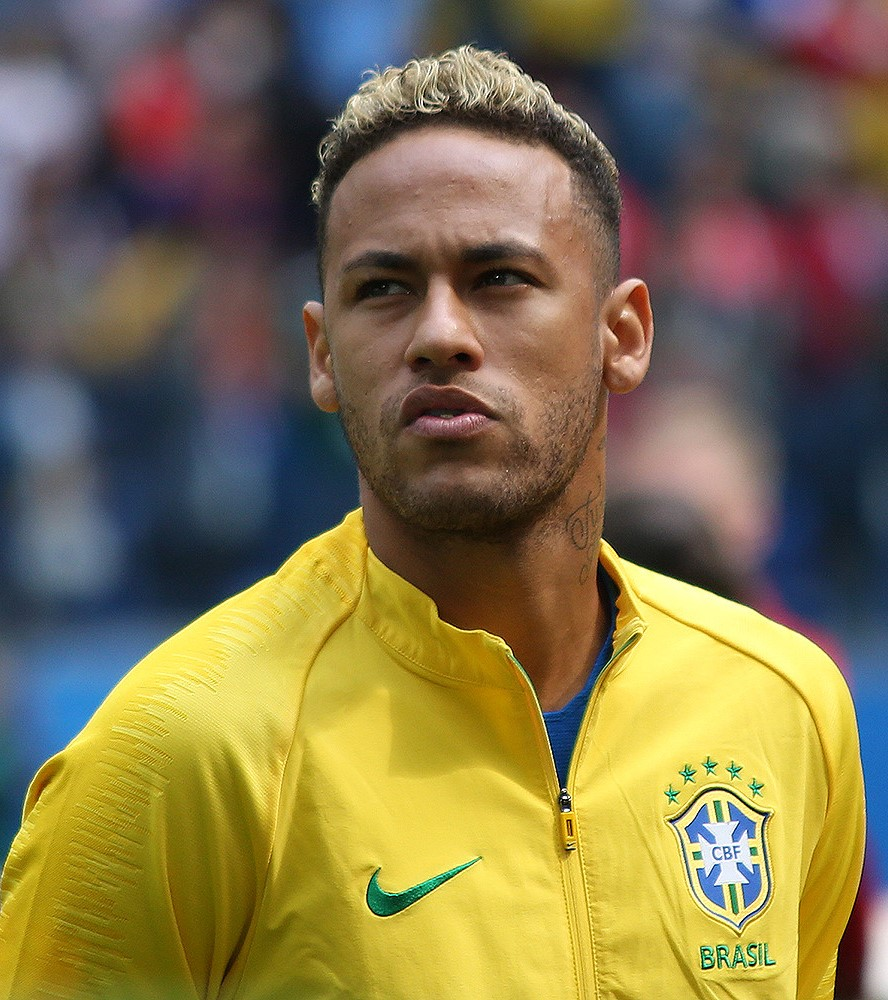
Neymar

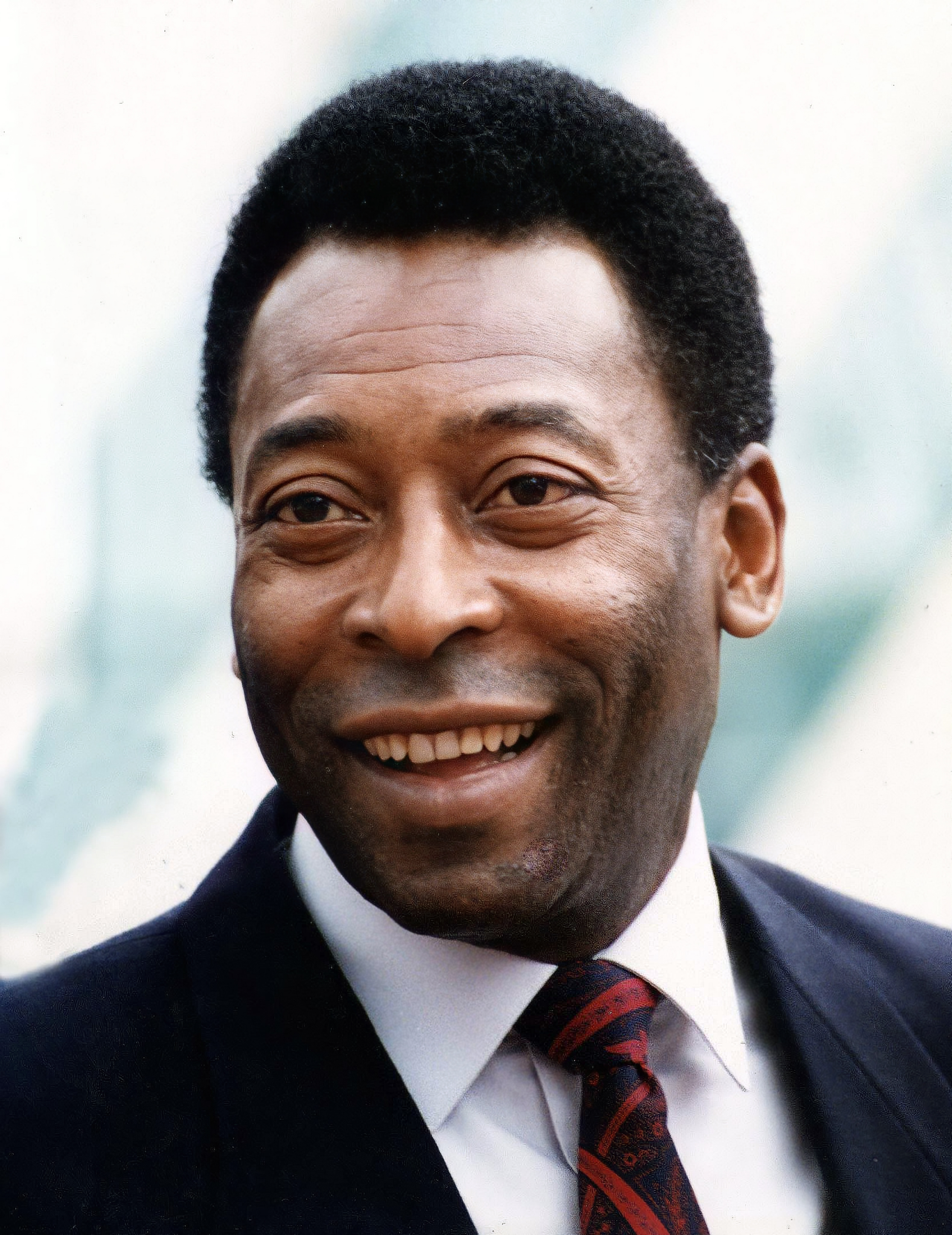
Pelé

=== Football ===
- Adriano (born 1982)
- Adriano (born 1985)
- Matheus Aurélio (born 1999)
- Alexandre Pato (born 1989)
- Alisson Becker (born 1992)
- Bebeto (born 1964)
- Benny Feilhaber (born 1985), footballer, center/attacking midfielder (AGF Aarhus & US national team)
- Bruno Guimarães (born 1997)
- Cafu (born 1970), footballer
- Casemiro (born 1992), football player for Real Madrid and three time UEFA Champions League Winner
- Dani Alves (born 1983)
- Daniel Tenenbaum (born 1995), goalkeeper
- Dante (born 1983)
- David Luiz (born 1987)
- Dida (born 1973)
- Douglas Costa (born 1990)
- Éder Militão (born 1998)
- Endrick (born 2006)
- Fabinho (born 1993)
- Fernandinho (born 1985)
- Garrincha (1933–1983)
- Gabriel Barbosa (born 1996)
- Gabriel Jesus (born 1997)
- Gabriel Magalhães (born 1997)
- Gabriel Martinelli (born 2001)
- Gil Cain (born 1988, in Brazil) , Israeli professional footballer
- Humberto (born 1966)
- Jairzinho (born 1944)
- João Pedro (born 2001)
- Joelinton (born 1996)
- Júlio César (football goalkeeper, born 1979)
- Lucas Moura (born 1992)
- Lucas Paquetá (born 1997)
- Lúcio (born 1978), retired footballer
- Kaká (born 1982)
- Lucas Leiva (born 1987)
- Lucas Moura (born 1992)
- Luís Fabiano (born 1980)
- Marcelo (born 1988)
- Matheus Cunha (born 1999)
- Marta (born 1986)
- Mancini (Brazilian footballer, born 1980)
- Marquinhos (born 1994)
- Neymar (born 1992)
- Oscar (born 1991)
- Pelé (1940–2022), football player, three-time World Cup Champion
- Philippe Coutinho (born 1992)
- Ramires (born 1987)
- Raphinha (born 1996)
- Rivaldo (born 1972)
- Rivellino (born 1946)
- Richarlison (born 1997)
- Roberto Carlos (born 1973), 2002 FIFA World Cup Champion
- Roberto Firmino (born 1991), footballer, Liverpool FC
- Robinho (born 1984)
- Rodrygo (born 2001)
- Rodrigo Caio (born 1993)
- Rogério Ceni (born 1973)
- Romário (born 1966)
- Ronaldinho (born 1980), footballer, two-time FIFA World Player of the Year
- Ronaldo (born 1976), footballer, two-time World Cup champion
- Taffarel (born 1966), 1994 FIFA World Cup Champion
- Thiago Silva (born 1984)
- Thiago Motta (born 1982)
- Vinícius Júnior (born 2000)
- Wesley (born 1989), footballer
- Willian (born 1988)
- Zico (born 1953), retired footballer
- Zizinho (1921–2002), retired footballer

=== Basketball ===
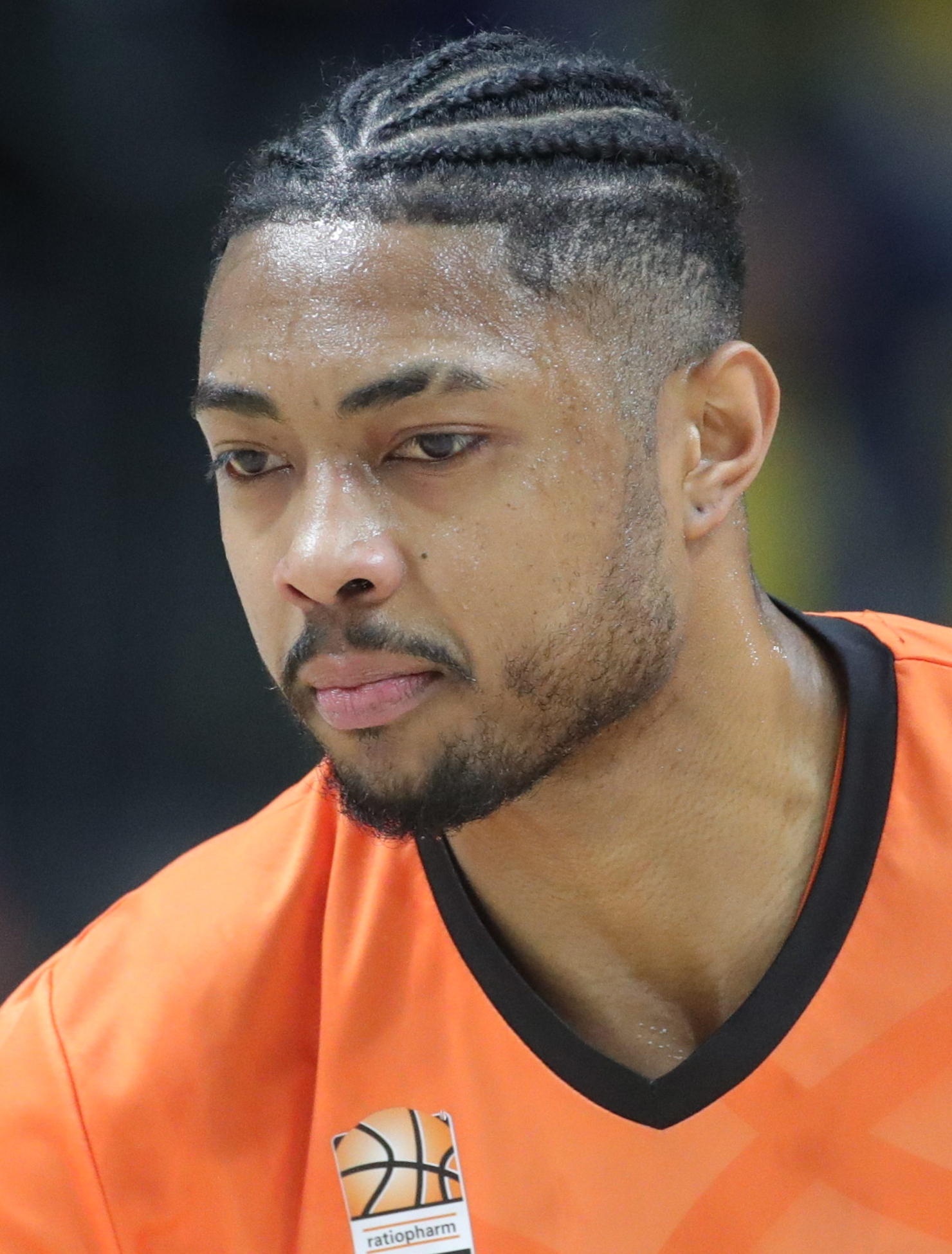
Bruno Caboclo

- Bruno Caboclo (born 1995), Israeli Basketball Premier League and former NBA player
- Fab Melo (1990–2017), former NBA player
- Leandro Barbosa (born 1982), NBA champion
- Moysés Blás (alternate spelling: Moses Blass; 1937– 2026), Olympic bronze medal winning basketball player
- Marcelo Huertas (born 1983), professional basketball player
- Nenê Hilário (born 1982), former NBA player
- Raul Neto (born 1992), Australian National Basketball League and former NBA player
- Márcio Santos (born 2002), player in the Israeli Premier Basketball League
- Oscar Schmidt (born 1958), retired basketball player
- Tiago Splitter (born 1985), coach and former NBA champion
- Anderson Varejão (born 1982), former NBA player

=== Volleyball ===
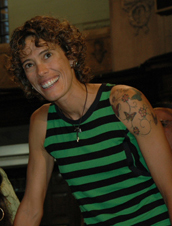
Adriana Behar

- Adriana Behar (born 1969), volleyball, beach player; two-time Olympic silver; Pan American champion; two-time world champion
- Alison Cerutti (born 1985), Olympic medalist and World Champion
- Marcelo Elgarten (born 1974), commonly known as Marcelinho, Olympic silver medalist volleyball player
- Bernard Rajzman (born 1957), Olympic silver; Pan American champion; world silver
- Bruno Oscar Schmidt (born 1986), Olympic medalist and World Champion
- Bruno Rezende (born 1986), Olympic medalist and World Champion
- Giba (born 1976), eight-time World League champion
- Lucas Saatkamp (born 1986), Olympic medalist and World Champion

=== Judo ===
- Camila Minakawa (born 1990), Brazilian-Israeli judoka, junior world champion bronze medalist
- Érika Miranda (born 1987), World Championship medalist
- Felipe Kitadai (born 1989), Olympic medalist
- Flávio Canto (born 1975), Olympic medalist
- Ketleyn Quadros (born 1987), Olympic medalist
- Leandro Guilheiro (born 1983), Olympic medalist
- Mayra Aguiar (born 1991), Olympic medalist and World Champion
- Rafael Silva (born 1987), two-time Olympic medalist
- Rafaela Silva (born 1992), Olympic Gold medalist and World Champion
- Sarah Menezes (born 1990), Olympic gold medalist
- Tiago Camilo (born 1982), two-time Olympic medalist and World Champion

=== Gymnastics ===
- Arthur Mariano (born 1993), Olympic medalist and World Champion
- Arthur Zanetti (born 1990), Olympic Gold medalist and World Champion
- Daiane dos Santos (born 1983), World Champion
- Daniele Hypólito (born 1984), World Championship medalist
- Diego Hypólito (born 1986), Olympic medalist and 2x World Champion
- Flávia Saraiva (born 1999)
- Jade Barbosa (born 1991), World Championship medalist
- Rebeca Andrade (born 1999), Olympic Gold medalist, 3x Olympic Silver medalist, 1x Olympic Bronze Medalist, 3x World Championship Gold medalist, 4x World Championship Sliver Medalist, & 2x World Championship Bronze medalist

=== Swimming ===
- Ana Marcela Cunha (born 1992), five-time World Champion
- Bruno Fratus (born 1989), World Championship medalist
- César Cielo (born 1987), two-time Olympic medalist, Olympic and World record holder
- Daniel Dias (born 1988), swimmer, paralympian
- Fernando Scherer (born 1974), Olympic medalist
- Gustavo Borges (born 1972), Olympic medalist
- Marcelo Chierighini (born 1991), World Championship medalist
- Patrícia Amorim (born 1969), Olympic freestyle swimmer and president of Clube de Regatas do Flamengo
- Poliana Okimoto (born 1983), Olympic medalist
- Thiago Pereira (born 1986), Olympic medalist

=== Athletics ===
- Almir dos Santos (born 1993)
- Caio Bonfim (born 1991)
- Darlan Romani (born 1991)
- Eronilde de Araújo (born 1970), Olympic finalist in 400 meters hurdles
- Fabiana Murer (born 1981), world champion pole vaulter
- Joaquim Cruz (born 1963), Olympic Gold medalist
- Maurren Maggi (born 1976), retired olympic gold medalist
- Robson Caetano (born 1964), Olympic medalist
- Thiago Braz da Silva (born 1993), Olympic Gold medalist

=== Auto racing ===
- Ayrton Senna (1960–1994), three-time Formula 1 World Champion
- Bruno Senna (born 1983), Formula One racing driver
- Christian Fittipaldi (born 1971), NASCAR driver/Indycar driver
- Emerson Fittipaldi (born 1946), Formula One two-time champion. Raced for McLaren, Lotus and Fittipaldi automotive
- Felipe Massa (born 1981), Formula One driver, notably for Scuderia Ferrari
- Felipe Nasr (born 1992), Formula One driver, notably for Sauber F1 Team
- Gabriel Bortoleto (born 2004), Formula One driver, notably for Audi
- Hélio Castroneves (born 1975), IndyCar driver
- Mario Haberfeld (born 1976), racing driver
- Nelson Piquet (born 1952), three-time Formula One world champion, raced for Williams, Benetton, McLaren, Ensign, and Brabham
- Ricardo Rosset (born 1968), racing driver
- Rubens Barrichello (born 1972), former Formula 1 driver, raced for Jordan, Stewart, Ferrari, Honda, Braun, and Williams
- Thomas Erdos (born 1963), auto racing driver, two-time Le Mans Series champion and 24 Hours of Le Mans winner
- Tony Kanaan (born 1974), IndyCar driver

=== Combat sports ===
- Alex Pereira (born 1987), former kickboxer, Mixed Martial Artist
- Alexandre Pantoja (born 1990), black belt in Brazilian jiu-jitsu, Current mixed martial arts Male World Champion
- Amanda Nunes (born 1988), black belt in Brazilian jiu-jitsu, Current mixed martial arts Female World Champion
- Anderson Silva (born 1975), black belt in Brazilian jiu-jitsu, Former mixed martial arts World Champion
- Charles Oliveira (born 1989), black belt in Brazilian jiu-jitsu, Former mixed martial arts World Champion
- Cris Cyborg (born 1985), black belt in Brazilian jiu-jitsu, Current mixed martial arts Female World Champion
- Deiveson Figueiredo (born 1987), black belt in Brazilian jiu-jitsu, Current mixed martial arts World Champion
- Gilbert Burns (born 1986), black belt in Brazilian jiu-jitsu, mixed martial artist
- Glover Teixeira (born 1979), Former World Champion Mixed Martial Artist
- Jéssica Andrade (born 1991), Former Female Mixed Martial Artist World Champion
- José Aldo (born 1986), Former World Champion Mixed Martial Artist
- Junior dos Santos (born 1984), Former World Champion Mixed Martial Artist
- Márcio "Macarrão" Stambowsky (1959–2026), 8th degree coral belt in Gracie Jiu-Jitsu
- Neiman Gracie (born 1988), mixed martial artist, Brazilian jiu-jitsu practitioner, and instructor
- Patricky Pitbull (born 1986), black belt in Brazilian jiu-jitsu, Current mixed martial arts World Champion
- Patrício Pitbull (born 1987), black belt in Brazilian jiu-jitsu, Current mixed martial arts World Champion
- Paulo Costa (born 1991), mixed martial artist
- Rafael dos Anjos (born 1984), black belt in Brazilian jiu-jitsu, Former mixed martial arts World Champion
- Thiago Alves (born 1983), mixed martial artist
- Lyoto Machida (born 1978), black belt in Machida Karate, Former mixed martial arts World Champion
- Marcio Navarro (born 1978), professional kickboxer and mixed martial artist
- Antônio Rodrigo Nogueira (born 1976), black belt in Brazilian jiu-jitsu, Former mixed martial arts World Champion
- Mauricio "Shogun" Rua (born 1981), black belt in Brazilian jiu-jitsu, Former mixed martial arts World Champion
- Murilo Rua (born 1980), black belt in Brazilian jiu-jitsu, Former mixed martial arts World Champion
- Wanderlei Silva (born 1976), black belt in Brazilian jiu-jitsu, Former mixed martial arts World Champion

=== Sailing ===
- Daniel Adler (born 1958), Olympic medalist
- Jorge Zarif (born 1992)
- Kahena Kunze (born 1991)
- Lars Grael (born 1964)
- Martine Grael (born 1991)
- Robert Scheidt (born 1973)

=== Surfing ===
- Adriano de Souza (born 1987)
- Filipe Toledo (born 1995)
- Gabriel Medina (born 1993)
- Ítalo Ferreira (born 1994)
- Phil Rajzman (born 1982), two-time World Surf League world champion
- Rodrigo Koxa (born 1979)

=== Tennis ===
- Maria Esther Bueno (1939–2018)
- Bruno Soares (born 1982)
- Fernando Meligeni (born 1971)
- Gustavo Kuerten (born 1976) three-time French Open winner
- João Fonseca (born 2006)
- Marcelo Melo (born 1983)
- Maureen Schwartz (died 2019), Pan American Games silver medalist
- Thiago Monteiro (born 1994)
- Thiago Seyboth Wild (born 2000)
- Thomaz Bellucci (born 1987)

=== Others ===
- Alexandre de Pontes (1968–1993), bodyboarder
- Bob Burnquist (born 1976), professional skateboarder
- Eric Maleson (born 1967), Olympic Bobsled ahlete
- Eurico Rosa Da Silva (born 1975), jockey
- Felipe Wu (born 1992), Olympic medalist in shooting
- Hugo Calderano (born 1996)
- Isaquias Queiroz (born 1994), Olympic medalist and World Champion in sprint canoeing
- Kevin Alves (born 1991), figure skater
- Maicon Siqueira (born 1993), Olympic medalist in Taekwondo
- Natália Falavigna (born 1984), Olympic medalist in Taekwondo
- Robson Conceição (born 1988), Olympic medalist in Boxing
- Rodrigo Pessoa (born 1972), Olympic champion show jumper
- Yan Gomes (born 1987), MLB player
- Yane Marques (born 1984), Olympic medalist in Modern Pentathlon

== Diplomats ==
- Barão do Rio Branco (1845–1912)
- Joaquim Nabuco (1849–1910)
- Jorge Sá Earp (1955-)
- Luiz Martins de Souza Dantas (1876–1954)
- Oswaldo Aranha (1894–1960)
- Rui Barbosa (1849–1923)
- Aimée de Heeren (1903–2006), WW2 secret service agent, fashion icon
- Walter Moreira Salles (1912–2001)
- Sérgio Vieira de Mello (1948–2003), UN representative

== Film directors ==
- Aluizio Abranches (born 1961)
- Ana Carolina (born 1945)
- Andrucha Waddington (born 1970)
- Anna Muylaert (born 1964)
- Alberto Cavalcanti (1897–1982), pioneer filmmaker
- Anselmo Duarte (1920–2009), Palme d'Or winner
- Arnaldo Jabor (1940–2022), Silver Berlin Bear-winner
- Bruno Barreto (born 1955), Golden Berlin Bear-nominated director
- Cacá Diegues (1940–2012)
- Cao Hamburger (born 1962)
- Carlos Reichenbach (1945–2012)
- Daniel Filho (born 1937)
- Daniela Thomas (born 1959)
- Eduardo Coutinho (1933–2014), documentary filmmaker
- Fabio Barreto (1957–2019)
- Fernando Meirelles (born 1955), Academy Award nominee
- Gabriel Mascaro (born 1983)
- Glauber Rocha (1939–1981), founder of Cinema Novo; Cannes Film Festival award-winning director
- Hector Babenco (1946–2016), Argentine-born Brazilian Academy Award-nominated director
- Heitor Dhalia (born 1970)
- Humberto Mauro (1897–1983), pioneer and inventive filmmaker
- João Moreira Salles (born 1962), documentary director
- Joaquim Pedro de Andrade (1932–1988), member of Cinema Novo
- Jorge Furtado (born 1959)
- José Mojica Marins (1936–2020), also known as Coffin Joe
- José Padilha (born 1967), Golden Berlin Bear winner
- Júlio Bressane (born 1946)
- Karim Aïnouz (born 1966)
- Kleber Mendonça Filho (born 1968)
- Leon Hirszman (1937–1987)
- Lima Barreto (1906–1982)
- Luiz de Barros (1893–1982)
- Luiz Fernando Carvalho (born 1960)
- Luís Sérgio Person (1936–1976)
- Marcelo Gomes (born 1963)
- Mário Peixoto (1908–1992), pioneer filmmaker
- Nelson Pereira dos Santos (1928–2018)
- Norma Bengell (1935–2013), director and actress
- Paulo César Saraceni (1933–2012)
- Petra Costa (born 1983) Academy Award nominee
- Roberto Farias (1932–2018)
- Roberto Santos (1928–1987)
- Rogério Sganzerla (1946–2004)
- Ruy Guerra (born in Mozambique, 1931), member of Cinema Novo
- Sérgio Machado (born 1968)
- Sérgio Rezende (born 1951)
- Suzana Amaral (1932–2020)
- Tata Amaral (born 1960)
- Vladimir Seixas (born 1981)
- Walter Hugo Khouri (1929–2003)
- Walter Lima Jr. (born 1938)
- Walter Salles (born 1956), Golden Berlin Bear winner; Academy Award winner

== Executives and business entrepreneurs ==
- Abílio Diniz (1936–2024)
- Aloysio de Andrade Faria (1920–2020)
- Álvaro Gonçalves
- Andre Medici (born 1956)
- Antônio Ermírio de Moraes (1928–2014)
- Aritana Maroni (born 1978)
- Armínio Fraga (born 1957)
- Arne Ragnar Enge
- Assis Chateaubriand (1892–1968)
- Bob Falkenburg (1926–2022)
- Carlos Ghosn (born 1954)
- Carlos Alberto Sicupira (born 1948)
- Cristina Junqueira (born 1984)
- Daniel Dantas (born 1954)
- Edmond Safra (1932–1999)
- Eduardo Saverin (born 1982)
- Eike Batista (born 1956)
- Count Francesco Matarazzo (1854–1937)
- Germán Efromovich (born 1950)
- Gustavo Brigagão
- Gustavo Franco (born 1956)
- Hélio Viana
- Henrique Meirelles (born 1945)
- João Carlos di Genio (1939–2022)
- Jorge Paulo Lemann (born 1939)
- José Alencar (1931–2011)
- Julio Bozano (born 1936)
- Luciano Hang (born 1962)
- Luiza Trajano (born 1948)
- Marcel Herrmann Telles (born 1950)
- Mike Krieger (born 1986)
- Norberto Odebrecht (1920–2014)
- Pedro Moreira Salles (born 1959)
- Ricardo Samuel Goldstein (born 1966)
- Ricardo Semler (born 1959)
- Roberto Marinho (1904–2003)
- Samuel Klein (1923–2014)
- Victor Civita (1907–1990)
- Walter Moreira Salles (1912–2001)

== Explorers and discoverers ==
- Cândido Rondon (1865–1958), famous explorer and engineer
- Orlando Villas Boas (1914–2003), explorer and indigenist
- Amyr Klink (born 1955), adventurer and navigator, first solo rowing across the South Atlantic
- Sydney Possuelo (born 1940), explorer, social activist and indigenous peoples expert
- Izabel Pimentel, first Brazilian and Latin American to sail solo around the world

== Fashion designers ==
- Alexandre Herchcovitch (born 1971)
- Amir Slama (born 1965)
- Carlos Falchi (1944–2015)
- Carlos Tufvesson (born 1968)
- Clodovil Hernandes (1937–2009) (Haute-Couture)
- Francisco Costa (born 1964) (Calvin Klein)
- Ocimar Versolato (1961–2017)
- Tufi Duek (born 1954) (Fórum / Triton)
- Zuzu Angel (1921–1976)

== Geologists ==
- Djalma Guimarães (1895–1973, born Santa Luzia, MG, died Belo Horizonte)
- Fernando Flávio Marques de Almeida (1916–2013), one of the most outstanding geologists of the 20th century
- José Bonifácio de Andrada e Silva (1763–1838)
- Louis Agassiz (1807–1873)
- Louis de Loczy (Hungria, 1897–1980, born Brazil, Rio de Janeiro)
- Orville Adalbert Derby (1851–1915, born Kellogsville, New York, died Rio de Janeiro), American geologist who worked in Brazil, particularly for the DNPM and CPRM
- Reinhard Maack (1892–1969, born in Herford-Germany, died in Curitiba-Brazil)
- Walter K. Link (1902–1982), US geologist; controversial organizer of oil exploration in Brazil
- Octávio Barbosa (1907–1997), Brazilian field geologist, prospector
- Heinz Ebert (1907–1983), born in Saxony, Germany, died in Rio Claro, São Paulo
- Aziz Ab'Saber (1924–2012, São Luiz do Paraitinga, São Paulo), Brazilian geoscientist
- Sérgio Estanislau do Amaral (1925–1996)
- Peter Szatmari, Hungarian geologist

== Intellectuals and thinkers ==
- Leonardo Boff (born 1938), friar, theologian, silenced by the Vatican due to his socialist stance
- Benjamin Constant (1836–1891), abolitionist and republican
- Francisco Doratioto (born 1956), historian
- Raymundo Faoro (1925–2003), jurist
- Paulo Freire (1921–1997), educator and university professor
- Olavo de Carvalho (1947–1922), educator and professor
- Esther Flesch (born 1967), lawyer
- Florestan Fernandes (1920–1995), sociologist
- Gilberto Freyre (1900–1987), sociologist
- Carlos Marighella (1911–1969), Marxist writer, politician and guerilla fighter
- Anna Veronica Mautner (1935–2019) psychologist, psychoanalyst, essayist and columnist Brazilian
- Pontes de Miranda (1892–1979), jurist, mathematician, philosopher and writer
- Elisabete Oliveira (1962–2019), educator and leading researcher of asexuality
- José do Patrocínio (1854–1905), liberal abolitionist and republican
- Darcy Ribeiro (1922–1997), anthropologist and educator, scientific leader and politician
- Jorge Stolfi (born 1950), computer scientist
- Milton Santos (1926–2001), geographer, writer and university professor

== Mathematicians ==
- Carolina Araujo (born 1976)
- Artur Ávila (born 1981)
- Manfredo do Carmo (1928–2018)
- Walter Carnielli (born 1952)
- Gauss Moutinho Cordeiro (born 1952)
- Celso José da Costa (born 1949)
- Newton da Costa (1929–2024)
- César Camacho (born 1943)
- Marcos Dajczer (born 1948)
- Francisco Dória (born 1945)
- Djairo Guedes de Figueiredo (born 1934)
- Leopoldo Penna Franca (1959–2012)
- Arnaldo Garcia (born 1950)
- Fernando Q. Gouvêa (born 1957)
- Alfredo Noel Iusem (born 1949)
- Yoshiharu Kohayakawa (born 1963)
- Elon Lages Lima (1929–2017)
- Artur Oscar Lopes (born 1950)
- Ricardo Mañé (1948–1995)
- Fernando Codá Marques (born 1979)
- Carlos Matheus (born 1984)
- Júlio César de Mello e Souza (1895–1974)
- Welington de Melo (1946–2016)
- Teixeira Mendes (1855–1927)
- Carlos Gustavo Moreira (born 1973)
- Leopoldo Nachbin (1922–1993)
- Antonio Carbonari Netto
- Helena J. Nussenzveig Lopes
- Valeria de Paiva (born 1959)
- Jacob Palis (1940–2025)
- Maurício Peixoto (1921–2019)
- Paulo Pinheiro (born 1967)
- Enrique Pujals (born 1967)
- Paulo Ribenboim (born 1928)
- Ruy de Queiroz (born 1958)
- Aron Simis (born 1942)
- Imre Simon (1943–2009)
- Joaquim Gomes de Souza (1829–1864)
- Jorge Manuel Sotomayor Tello (1942–2022)
- Keti Tenenblat (born 1944)
- Marcelo Viana (born 1962)
- José Felipe Voloch (born 1963)

== Models ==
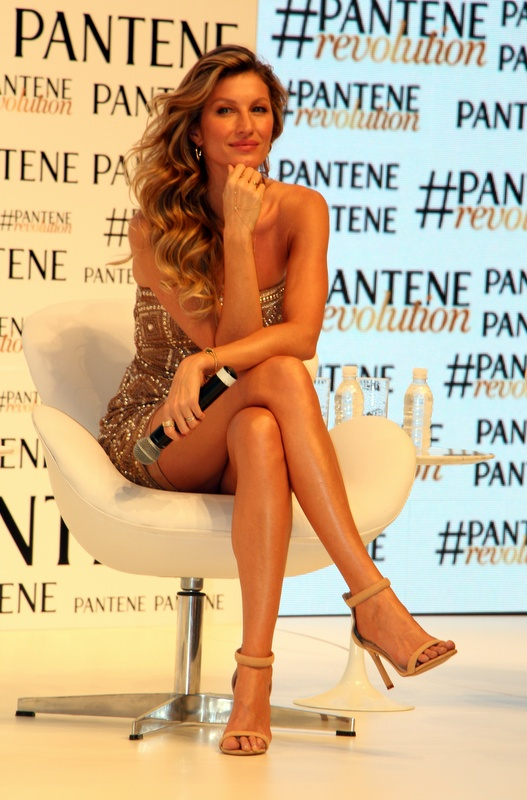
Gisele Bündchen

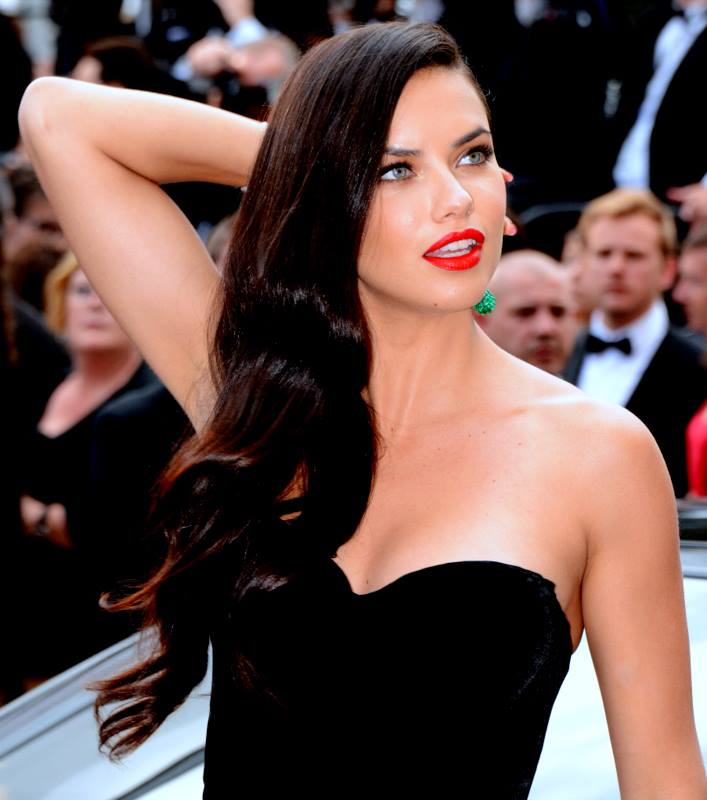
Adriana Lima

=== Female ===
- Adriana Lima (born 1981)
- Alessandra Ambrosio (born 1981)
- Aline Weber (born 1989)
- Ana Beatriz Barros (born 1982)
- Ana Carolina Reston (1985–2006)
- Ana Claudia Michels (born 1981)
- Ana Hickmann (born 1981)
- Bruna Tenório (born 1989)
- Camilla Finn (born 1991)
- Caroline Trentini (born 1987)
- Cintia Dicker (born 1986)
- Daiane Conterato (born 1990)
- Daniella Cicarelli (born 1978)
- Daniella Sarahyba (born 1984)
- Deise Nunes (born 1986)
- Emanuela de Paula (born 1989)
- Fabiana Semprebom (born 1984)
- Fernanda Lessa (born 1977)
- Fernanda Motta (born 1981)
- Fernanda Tavares (born 1980)
- Flavia de Oliveira (born 1983)
- Gianne Albertoni (born 1981)
- Gisele Bündchen (born 1980), model, actress
- Isabeli Fontana (born 1983)
- Isabella Melo (born 1993)
- Izabel Goulart (born 1984)
- Kat Torres (born 1992)
- Lais Ribeiro (born 1990)
- Letícia Birkheuer (born 1978)
- Luciana Curtis (born 1976)
- Luciana Gimenez (born 1969)
- Luíza Brunet (born 1962)
- Marcelle Bittar (born 1981)
- Mariana Weickert (born 1982)
- Michelle Alves (born 1978)
- Raica Oliveira (born 1984)
- Raquel Zimmermann (born 1983)
- Shirley Mallmann (born 1977)
- Solange Wilvert (born 1989)
- Yasmin Brunet (born 1988)

=== Male ===
- Evandro Soldati (born 1985)
- Francisco Lachowski (born 1991)
- Marlon Teixeira (born 1991)
- Miro Moreira (born 1984)
- Romulo Pires (born 1983)

== Military ==
- Baron of Amazonas (1804–1882), Admiral of the Navy, war hero, led the decisive Battle of Riachuelo
- Duke of Caxias (1803–1880), military commander, nationalist leader, "father of the Army"
- Anita Garibaldi (1821–1849), revolutionary combatant, fought in Brazil and Italy, was married to Giuseppe Garibaldi
- Bento Gonçalves (1788–1847), military commander, led a separatist movement
- Baron of Itapevi (1801–1886), patron of the artillery for the Brazilian Army
- Baron of Melgaço (1802–1880), admiral and several times president of Mato Grosso
- Admiral Tamandaré (1807–1897), military combatant, war veteran, "father of the Navy"
- Tiradentes (1746–1792), leader of a failed conspiracy against the Portuguese, executed by hanging followed by quartering

== Monarchs ==
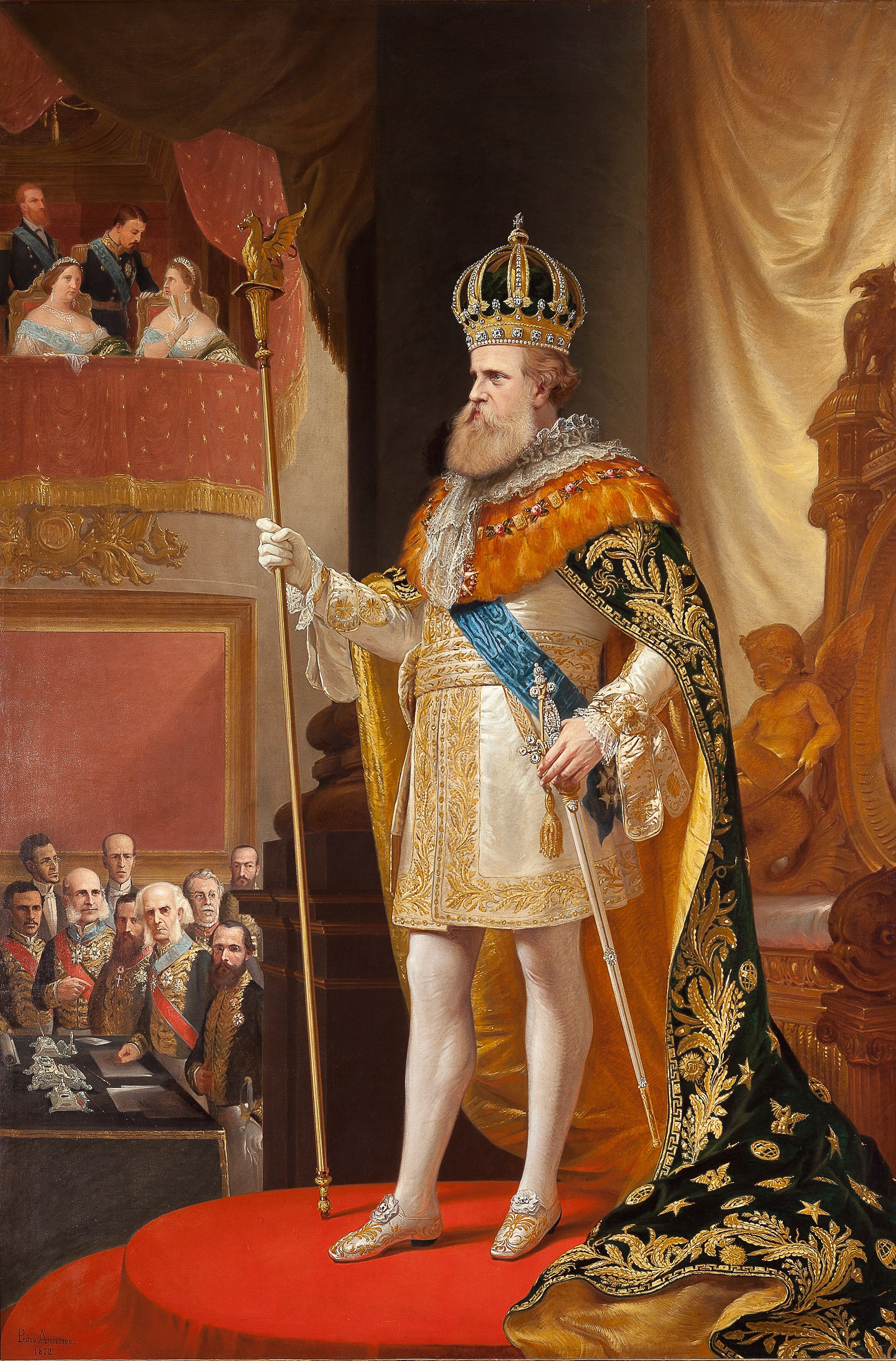
Emperor Pedro II

- King John VI (1767–1826)
- Queen Maria I (1734–1816)
- Emperor Pedro I (1798–1834)
- Emperor Pedro II (1825–1891)

== Musicians ==
=== Classical ===
- Antônio Carlos Gomes (1836–1896)
- Heitor Villa-Lobos (1887–1959)

=== Popular ===
- Alessandro Framil (born 1975), frontman singer of skangroots; lead vocalist
- Adoniran Barbosa (1912–1982)
- Amon Tobin (born 1972), electronic musician
- Anitta (born 1993), pop singer
- Antônio Carlos Jobim (1927–1994), composer, songwriter
- Arnaldo Antunes (born 1960)
- Astrud Gilberto (1940–2023), singer
- Andre Matos (1971–2019), singer
- Andreas Kisser (born 1968), guitarist
- Baden Powell (guitarist) (1937–2000), guitarist
- Bebel Gilberto (born 1966), singer
- Beto Guedes (born 1951)
- Caetano Veloso (born 1942), MPB singer-songwriter
- Cartola (1908–1980)
- Chico Buarque (born 1944)
- Clara Nunes (1942–1983)
- Claudia Leitte (born 1980), axé singer
- Chorão (1970–2013)
- Djavan (born 1949)
- Elis Regina (1945–1982)
- Gal Costa (1945–2022)
- Gilberto Gil (born 1942)
- Herbert Vianna (born 1961)
- Ivete Sangalo (born 1972), axé singer
- João Gilberto (1931–2019), singer-songwriter, guitarist
- Jorge Ben (born 1939)
- Kelly Key (born 1983), pop/R&B singer
- Lô Borges (1952–2025)
- Ludmilla (singer) (born 1995), pop singer
- Mallu Magalhães (born 1992), folk singer
- Maria Bethânia (born 1946)
- Marília Mendonça (1995–2021), sertaneja singer
- Marisa Monte (born 1967), MPB singer
- Marcelo Falcão (born 1973)
- Milton Nascimento (born 1942)
- Ney Matogrosso (born 1941)
- Negra Li (born 1979)
- Pabllo Vittar (born 1993), pop singer
- Renato Russo (1960–1996)
- Rita Lee (1947–2023)
- Sandy (born 1983), pop singer
- Tim Maia (1942–1998), singer-songwriter
- Tom Zé (born 1936)
- Yamandu Costa (born 1980), guitarist and composer

== Nurses and physicians ==
- Ana Néri (1814–1880), pioneering nurse; assisted Brazilian forces on the battlefield, "mother of nursery"

== Politicians ==
- Adriane Lopes (born 1976); mayor of Campo Grande
- Aécio Neves (born 1960); federal deputy by Minas Gerais; ex-president of the Federal Chamber of Deputies; ex-senator by Minas Gerais; ex-national president of Brazilian Social Democracy Party
- Alfredo Sirkis (1950–2020); ex-federal deputy by Rio de Janeiro; defeated presidencial candidate
- André Franco Montoro (1916–1999); ex-governor of the state of São Paulo; ex-senator by São Paulo; ex-minister of Labour
- Adhemar de Barros (1901–1969); ex-governor of the state of São Paulo for two times; ex-mayor of the city of São Paulo
- Anthony Garotinho (born 1960); ex-governor of the state of Rio de Janeiro; defeated presidential candidate
- Artur da Costa e Silva (1899–1969); ex-president of Brazil; ex-minister of War; ex-minister of Mines and Energy
- Arthur do Val (born 1986); state deputy of São Paulo
- Carlos Lacerda (1914–1977), ex-governor of the state of Guanabara; ex-federal deputy by the Federal District
- Celso Russomanno (born 1956); federal deputy by São Paulo
- Cesar Maia (born 1945); alderman of Rio de Janeiro; ex-mayor of the city of Rio de Janeiro
- Cid Gomes (born 1963); senator by Ceará; ex-governor of the state of Ceará; ex-minister of Education; ex-mayor of the city of Sobral; ex-state deputy of Ceará
- Daiana Santos (born 1982); deputy in the federal Chamber of Deputies
- Davi Alcolumbre (born 1977); president of the Federal Senate; senator by Amapá
- Dilma Rousseff (born 1947); ex-president of Brazil, impeached; ex-Chief of Staff of the Presidency; ex-minister of Mines and Energy
- Deodoro da Fonseca (1827–1892); ex-president of Brazil; ex-president of São Pedro do Rio Grande do Sul Province
- Djalma Bom (born 1939); founding member of the country's Workers' Party
- Eduardo Bolsonaro (born 1984); federal deputy by São Paulo; son of president of Brazil Jair Bolsonaro. He was the most voted federal deputy of the history of Brazil until today
- Eduardo Campos (1965–2014); ex-governor of Pernambuco; ex-minister of Science and Technology
- Eduardo Jorge Martins (born 1949); ex-federal deputy by São Paulo; defeated presidencial candidate; defeated vice-presidential candidate
- Eduardo Suplicy (born 1941); ex-senator by São Paulo
- Enéas Carneiro (1938–2007); ex-federal deputy by São Paulo
- Ernesto Geisel (1907–1996); ex-president of Brazil; ex-office executive of the Institutional Security Bureau (Then named the "Military Office"); ex-minister of the Superior Militar Court
- Esperidião Amin (born 1947); senator by Santa Catarina; ex-governor of the state of Santa Catarina for two times; ex-mayor of the city of Florianópolis
- Eurico Gaspar Dutra (1883–1974); ex-president of Brazil; ex-minister of War
- Fernando Collor de Mello (born 1949); senator by Alagoas; ex-president of Brazil, impeached; ex-governor of the state of Alagoas; ex-mayor of the city of Maceió
- Fernando Henrique Cardoso (born 1931); ex-president of Brazil; ex-senator by São Paulo; ex-minister of Exchequer; ex-minister of Foreign Affairs
- Flávio Bolsonaro (born 1981); senator by Rio de Janeiro
- Floriano Peixoto (1839–1895); ex-president of Brazil; ex-vice-president of Brazil; ex-president of Mato Grosso province
- Geraldo Alckmin (born 1952); ex-governor of the state of São Paulo; defeated presidential candidate for two times
- Getúlio Vargas (1882–1954); ex-president of Brazil; ex-governor of the state of Rio Grande do Sul; ex-senator by Rio Grande do Sul; ex-minister of Exchequer
- Golbery do Couto e Silva (1911–1987); ex-Chief of Staff of the Presidency
- Hamilton Mourão (born 1953); vice-president of Brazil
- Jânio Quadros (1917–1992); ex-president of Brazil; ex-governor of the state of São Paulo; ex-mayor of the city of São Paulo
- Jair Bolsonaro (born 1955); former president of Brazil; army officer, ex-federal deputy by Rio de Janeiro
- Joice Cristina Hasselmann (born 1978); federal deputy by São Paulo
- João Amoêdo (born 1962); national president of New Party; defeated presidential candidate
- João Doria (born 1957); governor of the state of São Paulo; ex-mayor of the city of São Paulo
- João Goulart (1919–1976); ex-president of Brazil, deposed by a coup; ex-vice-president of Brazil; ex-minister of Labour, Industry and Trade
- José Bonifácio de Andrada e Silva (1763–1838); ex-minister of Foreign Affairs; hero of independence
- José Dirceu (born 1946); ex-Chief of Staff of the Presidency; ex-federal deputy by São Paulo; ex-state deputy of São Paulo; ex-national president of Worker's Party
- José Sarney (born 1930); ex-president of Brazil; ex-vice-president of Brazil; ex-president of the Federal Senate; ex-governor of the state of Maranhão; ex-senator by Maranhão; ex-senator by Amapá
- Júlio Prestes (1882–1946); ex-president of Brazil, did not take office; ex-governor of the state of São Paulo
- Juscelino Kubitschek (1902–1976); ex-president of Brazil; ex-governor of the state of Minas Gerais
- Kim Kataguiri (born 1996); federal deputy by São Paulo
- Leonel Brizola (1922–2004); ex-governor of the state of Rio de Janeiro; ex-governor of the state of Rio Grande do Sul
- Luciana Genro (born 1971); ex-federal deputy by Rio Grande do Sul; defeated presidential candidate; daughter of Tarso Genro - Socialism and Liberty Party (PSOL)
- Luís Carlos Prestes (1898–1990); ex-senator by Federal District; ex-general secretary of Brazilian Communist Party
- Luiz Inácio Lula da Silva (born 1945); president of Brazil
- Manuela d'Ávila (born 1981); ex-federal deputy by Rio Grande do Sul; ex-state deputy of Rio Grande do Sul; defeated vice-presidential candidate - Communist Party of Brazil (PCdoB)
- Marcelo Freixo (born 1967); federal deputy by Rio de Janeiro
- Marielle Franco (1979–2018); ex-alderwoman of Rio de Janeiro
- Mário Covas (1930–2001); ex-governor of the state of São Paulo; ex-senator by São Paulo; ex-mayor of the city of São Paulo
- Marina Silva (born 1958); national president of Sustainability Network; ex-senator by Acre; ex-minister of the Environment; defeated presidencial candidate for three times
- Marta Suplicy (born 1945); ex-vice-president of the Federal Senate; ex-senator by São Paulo; ex-minister of Culture; ex-minister of Turism; ex-mayor of the city of São Paulo
- Max Rosenmann (1944–2008); politician, businessman, and attorney
- Michel Temer (born 1940); ex-president of Brazil; ex-vice-president of Brazil; ex-president of the Federal Chamber of Deputies
- Miguel Arraes (1916–2005); ex-governor of the state of Pernambuco; ex-mayor of the city of Recife
- Oswaldo Aranha (1894–1960); ex-president of the United Nations General Assembly; ex-governor of the state of Rio Grande do Sul; ex-minister of Foreign Affairs; ex-minister of Exchequer; ex-minister of Justice
- Luiz Loures; Deputy Executive Director, Joint United Nations Programme on HIV/AIDS (UNAIDS)
- Paulo Maluf (born 1931); ex-governor of the state of São Paulo; ex-mayor of the city of São Paulo
- Princess Isabel (1846–1921), Princess Imperial of Brazil, later de jure Empress of Brazil, daughter of Emperor D. Pedro II, signed the abolition of slavery in the country
- Prudente de Morais (1841–1902); ex-president of Brazil; ex-president of the Federal Senate; ex-governor of the state of São Paulo
- Rodrigo Maia (born 1970); president of the Federal Chamber of Deputies; federal deputy by Rio de Janeiro
- Romeu Zema (born 1964); governor of the state of Minas Gerais
- Tancredo Neves (1910–1985); ex-president of Brazil, died before took office; ex-prime minister of Brazil
- Tarso Genro (born 1947); ex-governor of the state of Rio Grande do Sul; ex-minister of Education; ex-minister of Justice; ex-minister of institutional relations
- Tristão de Alencar Araripe (1821–1908), republican leader
- Zumbi dos Palmares (1655–1695), leader of the Quilombo dos Palmares

== Religious leaders ==
- Antonio Conselheiro (1830–1897), also known outside Brazil as "The Counselor", founder of Canudos
- Inri Cristo (born 1948), claims to be Jesus
- Saint Anthony of Saint Anne Galvão (Friar Galvão) (1739–1822), friar, Catholic saint
- D. Helder Câmara (1909–1999), Archbishop of Olinda and Recife, a fierce defender of civil rights during the military regime
- D. Paulo Evaristo Arns (1921–2016), former Archbishop of São Paulo, also a civil rights leader
- D. Cláudio Hummes (1934–2022), Bishop, Archbishop and Cardinal of São Paulo, current mayor of the Congregation for the Clergy
- Helvécio Martins (1930–2005), General Authority of The Church of Jesus Christ of Latter-day Saints
- Irmã Mônica (born 1976), Evangelical digital influencer
- Ulisses Soares (born 1958), Apostle of The Church of Jesus Christ of Latter-Day Saints
- Chico Xavier (1910–2002), main figure of Spiritism

== Journalists and TV celebrities ==
- Abelardo Barbosa (1917–1988)
- Angélica (born 1973)
- Boris Casoy (born 1941)
- Eliana (born 1973)
- Fátima Bernardes (born 1962)
- Glória Maria (1949–2023)
- Jô Soares (1938–2022)
- Maria Júlia Coutinho (born 1978)
- Rodrigo Souza Leão (1965–2009)
- Marília Gabriela (born 1948)
- Pedro Bial (born 1958)
- Silvio Santos (1930–2024)
- Xuxa (born 1963)
- William Bonner (born 1963)

== Writers ==
=== Fictionists ===
- Alfredo D'Escragnolle Taunay (1843–1871)
- Aluísio Azevedo (1857–1913)
- Clarice Lispector (1925–1977)
- Dalton Trevisan (1925–2024)
- Érico Verissimo (1905–1975)
- Fernando Sabino (1923–2004)
- Graciliano Ramos (1892–1953)
- João Guimarães Rosa (1908–1967)
- Jorge Amado (1912–2001)
- José de Alencar (1829–1877)
- José Lins do Rego (1901–1957)
- Lima Barreto (1881–1922)
- Luis Fernando Veríssimo (1936–2025)
- Lya Luft (1938–2021)
- Lygia Fagundes Telles (1918–2022)
- Machado de Assis (1839–1908)
- Mário de Andrade (1893–1945)
- Márcio Souza (1946–2024)
- Monteiro Lobato (1882–1948)
- Oswald de Andrade (1890–1954)
- Paulo Coelho (born 1947)
- Raduan Nassar (born 1935)
- Rachel de Queiroz (1910–2003)
- Raul Pompeia (1863–1895)
- Rubem Fonseca (1925–2020)

=== Poets ===
- Adélia Prado (born 1935)
- Alphonsus de Guimaraens (1870–1921)
- Álvares de Azevedo (1831–1852)
- Augusto dos Anjos (1884–1914)
- Antônio Gonçalves Dias (1823–1864)
- Carlos Drummond de Andrade (1902–1987)
- Castro Alves (1847–1871)
- Cecília Meireles (1901–1964)
- Cruz e Sousa (1861–1898)
- Flávio Viegas Amoreira (1965-)
- Ferreira Gullar (1930–2016)
- Gregório de Matos (1636–1696)
- Haroldo de Campos (1929–2003)
- Helena Kolody (1912–2004)
- João Cabral de Melo Neto (1920–1999)
- Jorge Sá Earp (1955-)
- Lucila Nogueira (1950–2016)
- Manoel de Barros (1916–2014)
- Manuel Bandeira (1886–1968)
- Menotti del Picchia (1892–1988)
- Murilo Mendes (1901–1975)
- Olavo Bilac (1865–1918)
- Paulo Leminski (1944–1989)
- Tomás Antônio Gonzaga (1744–1810)
- Vinícius de Moraes (1913–1980)

=== Playwrights ===
- Ariano Suassuna (1927–2014)
- Gianfrancesco Guarnieri (1934–2006)
- Maria Clara Machado (1921–2001)
- Nelson Rodrigues (1912–1980)
- Oduvaldo Vianna Filho (1936–1974)

=== Essayists and critics ===
- Alfredo Bosi (1936–2021)
- Antonio Candido (1918–2017)
- Euclides da Cunha (1866–1909)
- Otto Maria Carpeaux (1900–1978)

== Science and technology ==
- Manuel de Abreu (1894–1962), physician, inventor of abreugraphy (mass radiography of the lungs for screening tuberculosis)
- Aziz Ab'Saber (1924–2012), geographer; geologist; ecologist recognized for the Theory of Refuges and Amazon studies; former president of the SBPC
- Fernando Flávio Marques de Almeida (1916–2013), geologist
- Carlos Paz de Araújo, scientist and inventor, holds nearly 600 patents in the area of nanotechnology
- José Márcio Ayres (1954–2003), biologist, zoologist, primatologist
- Marcia Barbosa (born 1960), physicist
- Abrahão de Moraes (1916–1970), astronomer and mathematician
- Eddy Bensoussan (born 1938), physician
- Wilson Teixeira Beraldo (1917–1998), co-discoverer of bradykinin
- Thaisa Storchi Bergmann (born 1955), astrophysicist at the Universidade Federal do Rio Grande do Sul
- Carlos Augusto Bertulani (born 1955), physicist
- Vital Brazil (1865–1950), physician and scientist, discoverer of the antivenom for snakes and other venomous animals
- Ennio Candotti (1942–2023), physicist and scientific leader
- Fernando Henrique Cardoso (born 1931), sociologist and former President
- José Cândido de Melo Carvalho (1914–1994), biologist, zoologist, entomologist
- Guilherme "Bill" Cardoso, Brazilian-American entrepreneur, engineer, and scientist.
- Carlos Chagas (1879–1934), biologist, zoologist, public health worker
- Evandro Chagas (1905–1940), physician and biomedical scientist specialized in tropical medicine; son of Carlos Chagas
- Gauss Moutinho Cordeiro (born 1952), mathematician and statistician
- Vera Cordeiro (born 1950), social entrepreneur and physician
- Newton da Costa (1929–2024), mathematician and logician, recognised for his works in paraconsistent logic
- Oswaldo Cruz (1872–1917), physician and public health champion, eliminated yellow fever, bubonic plague and smallpox in Rio de Janeiro at the turn of the 20th century
- Johanna Döbereiner (1924–2000), biologist, discoverer of the nitrogen fixing role of soil bacteria
- Adolpho Ducke (1876–1959), Croatian-Brazilian biologist; zoologist; entomologist; botanist
- André Rodrigues Durães, Brazilian physician and researcher
- Florestan Fernandes (1920–1995), father of Brazilian sociology
- Sérgio Henrique Ferreira (1934–2016), physician and pharmacologist, discovered the active principle of a drug for hypertension
- Carlos Chagas Filho (1910–2000), physician and physiologist, former president of the Brazilian Academy of Sciences, former president of the Pontifical Academy of Sciences; son of Carlos Chagas
- Hércules Florence (1804–1879), pioneer of photography
- Santiago Americano Freire (1908–1997), physician and professor of pharmacology, psychiatrist, writer, painter
- Gilberto Freyre (1900–1987), historiographer and sociologist
- Celso Furtado (1920–2004), noted economist and ideologue of economy of developing nations
- Marcelo Gleiser (born 1959), physicist, writer and professor of physics and astronomy at the Dartmouth College since 1991
- José Goldemberg (born 1928), physicist, former Minister of Science & Technology and Dean of the University of São Paulo
- Émil Göldi (1859–1917), Swiss-Brazilian biologist; zoologist; naturalist
- Bartolomeu de Gusmão (1685–1724), Brazilian Catholic priest, pioneer of aviation, the inventor of the balloon, became known as the "flying priest"
- Jacques Hüber (1867–1914), Swiss-Brazilian biologist; botanist
- Ivan Izquierdo (1937–2021), physician and neuroscientist; discovered neural mechanisms of memory
- Jean Paul Jacob (1937–2019), electronic engineer, researcher and professor, research manager at the Almaden IBM Research Center, California
- Adib Jatene (1929–2014), heart surgeon
- Alexander Kellner (born 1961), Liechtensteinian/Brazilian paleontologist
- Warwick Estevam Kerr (1922–2018), geneticist, researcher on the biology and genetics of bees
- Eduardo Krieger (born 1928), physician and physiologist, former president of the Brazilian Academy of Sciences
- César Lattes (1924–2005), experimental physicist, co-discoverer of the pion, a type of subatomic particle, first president of the Brazilian National Research Council
- Napoleão Laureano (1914–1951), cancer researcher
- Aristides Leão (1914–1993), physician and physiologist, discovered Leão's depression, a phenomenon of nervous tissue
- Ângelo Moreira da Costa Lima (1887–1964), doctor, entomologist
- Henrique da Rocha Lima (1879–1956), physician, pathologist and infectologist, discovered Rickettsia prowazekii, the pathogen of epidemic typhus
- José Leite Lopes (1918–2006), theoretical physicist
- Adolfo Lutz (1855–1940), physician and pioneer of public health
- José Lutzenberger (1926–2002), ecologist and zoologist
- Roberto Landell de Moura (1861–1928), pioneer of telephony
- Fritz Müller (1821–1897), German-Brazilian biologist; zoologist; botanist; naturalist; entomologist
- Miguel Nicolelis (born 1961), neuroscientist, one of Scientific American's best scientists of 2004
- Jacob Palis (1940–2025), mathematician of international fame, president of the Brazilian Academy of Sciences
- Maurício Peixoto (1921–2019), engineer, mathematician, pioneered the studies on structural stability, author of Peixoto's theorem
- Domingos Soares Ferreira Penna (1818–1888), biologist, zoologist, naturalist
- José Aristodemo Pinotti (1934–2009), physician and gynecologist, former president of the International Federation of Gynecology and Obstetrics
- Marcos Pontes (born 1963), first Brazilian astronaut, Missão Centenário
- Patricia Pranke (born 1967), stem cell researcher, professor
- Ana Maria Primavesi (1920–2020), soil scientist and promoter of the ecological management of tropical soils
- André Rebouças (1838–1898), pioneer engineer, brother of Antônio Rebouças Filho
- José Reis (1907–2002), biologist, greatest Brazilian science writer
- Gilberto Righi (1937–1999), biologist, zoologist, specialist on earthworms
- Carlos Rittl (living), scientist and environmentalist
- Nora Tausz Rónai (born 1924), holocaust survivor, architect, writer and masters swimmer
- Milton Santos (1926–2001), geographer, won the Vautrin Lud International Geography Prize, the highest award that can be gained in the field of geography
- Alberto Santos-Dumont (1873–1932), aviator and inventor
- Ademar Agostinho Sauthier (1940), theologist
- Mário Schenberg (1914–1990), theoretical physicist
- Helmut Sick (1910–1991), German-Brazilian biologist; zoologist; ornithologist
- Lotar Siewerdt (born 1939), agronomist; forage production
- Manuel Augusto Pirajá da Silva (1873–1961), responsible for the identification and complete description of the pathogenic agent and the pathophysiological cycle of schistosomiasis disease
- Maurício Rocha e Silva (1910–1983), physician and pharmacologist, discovered bradykinin, an active cardiovascular peptide
- Emílio Joaquim da Silva Maia (1808–1859), physician and naturalist
- Nise da Silveira (1905–1999), psychiatrist and mental health reformer
- Jorge Stolfi (born 1950), computer scientist, professor at UNICAMP
- Jayme Tiomno (1920–2011), experimental and theoretical nuclear physicist
- Paulo Emílio Vanzolini (1924–2013), biologist, zoologist, herpetologist
- Glaci Zancan (1935–2007), biochemist
- Mayana Zatz (born 1947), biologist and geneticist
- Euryclides Zerbini (1912–1993), heart surgeon, pioneer of first heart transplant in Brazil

== Foreign scientists and engineers who lived or live in Brazil ==
- Alexander Grothendieck (1928–2014), French mathematician
- David Bohm (1917–1992), American physicist
- Gregory Chaitin (born 1947), Argentine-American mathematician
- Louis Couty (1854–1884), French physiologist and pharmacologist
- Miguel Rolando Covian (1913–1992), Argentinian physiologist
- Orville Adalbert Derby (1851–1915), American geologist
- Heinz Ebert (1907–1983), German geologist
- Luigi Fantappiè (1901–1956), Italian mathematician
- Richard Feynman (1918–1988), American physicist
- Carlos Hamilton Vasconcelos Araújo (born 1964), economist and engineer
- Charles Frederick Hartt (1840–1878), Canadian-American geologist and paleontologist
- Hermann von Ihering (1850–1930), German naturalist
- Fritz Köberle (1910–1983), Austrian physician and pathologist
- Grigori Ivanovitch Langsdorff (1774–1852), German/Russian naturalist
- Claude Lévi-Strauss (1908–2009), French anthropologist
- Emmanuel Liais (1826–1900), French astronomer and naturalist
- Lucien Lison (1908–1984), Belgian anatomist
- Fritz Müller (1821–1897), German naturalist
- Giuseppe Occhialini (1907–1993), Italian physicist
- Ludwig Riedel (1790–1861), German botanist
- Oscar Sala (1922–2010), Italian nuclear physicist
- Carl August Wilhelm Schwacke (1848–1904), German botanist
- Friedrich Sellow (1789–1831), German botanist
- Helmut Sick (1910–1991), German zoologist
- Peter Szatmari (born 1950), Hungarian geologist
- Gleb Wataghin (1899–1986), Russian/Italian physicist
- Stefan Zweig (1881–1942), Austrian novelist, playwright, journalist and biographer

== Others ==
- Maira Gomez, indigenous TikTok personality and influencer
- Inah Canabarro Lucas (1908–2025), supercentenarian and oldest living person in the world from December 29, 2024, to April 30, 2025

== See also ==
- Brazilian diaspora
- Brazilian Americans
- Brazilian Canadians
- List of Brazilian British people
- List of Brazilian Americans
- Native Brazilians
- Brazilians in France
- Brazilians in the United Kingdom
- Brazilians in Japan
- Afro-Brazilians
