= Álvaro Gonçalves =

Brazilian businessman

Álvaro L. Gonçalves is a Brazilian businessman. He played a leading role in the development of the Brazilian investment environment.

== Early life ==
Gonçalves holds a BSc in Industrial Engineering from FEI (Brazil), with extensions in Business Administration from FGV-SP (Brazil) and an MBA from the International Institute for Management Development in Switzerland.

== Career ==
Gonçalves began his career in 1984 at Duratex (part of Itau Group), a mid-market supplier for the civil construction sector.

Gonçalves advised restructuring situations as manager of Banco Pactual’s corporate finance division, in 1994.

He worked as a corporate executive, including leading two turnarounds of national segment leaders. In 1996, he was CEO of Lacta, Brazil's largest chocolate producer. In 1990, he was CFO of the Pullman Group, a leading Brazilian bakery products company.

He worked two years as Managing Director of Pactual Electra Capital Partners – one of the first private equity funds in Brazil.

He co-founded Stratus Group in 1999,

He served as Chairman of the Brazilian Private Equity Association and directly participated in institutional efforts that resulted in regulatory improvements and better understanding of investment firms by government authorities and capital market institutions.

Gonçalves served on the Listing Committee of the Brazilian Stock Exchange, BM&F Bovespa. He led discussions about mid-market company access to the public market.

In the international context, Gonçalves served on governing bodies of the Global Emerging Markets Private Equity Association (EMPEA) as a member of the Advisory Council. He also served as a director of the Latin American Private Equity and Venture Capital Association (LAVCA).
