= Max Rosenmann =

Brazilian politician, businessman, and attorney (1944–2008)

Max Rosenmann (29 November 1944 – 25 October 2008) was a Brazilian politician, businessman, and attorney.

== Life and career ==
He was born on 29 November 1944, the son of Bernardo Rosenmann and Otília Rosenmann. Rosenmann graduated with a law degree from the Federal University of Paraná in 1973. After graduating, he worked in the jewelry business. From 1984 to 1985 he was the superintendent director of the State Pension Institute (IPE) while also serving as administrative advisor of the Development Bank of Paraná between 1983 and 1985.

Rosenmann served six terms as a federal deputy in the state of Paraná from 1987 to 2008. Rosenmann was affiliated to the PDT, PRN, PSDB and PMDB, party to which he returned in 2001. In the Chamber of Deputies, he served on the Environment and Minorities, Mining and Energy, Transport, Consumer Protection and Finance and Taxation committees. On 25 October 2008, Rosenmann suffered a cerebral hemorrhage and died at the Santa Cruz Hospital in Curitiba. He had a wife and three children. Rosenmann was buried at the Israeli Cemetery Santa Cândida.
