= Maira Gomez =

Brazilian influencer

Instagram information
- Page: cunhaporanga_oficial
- Followers: 540k

TikTok information
- Page: cunhaporanga_oficial
- Followers: 6.5m
- Last updated: 13 February 2026

Maira Gomez, also known by her native name Jūgoa and known online as Cunhaporanga, is an indigenous Brazilian influencer. A member of the Tatuyo people, she creates educational vlog videos on TikTok about her life and experiences as an indigenous woman in the Alto Rio Negro Indigenous Territory.

During the COVID-19 pandemic in Brazil, visits to Gomez's village decreased and sources of income such as handicrafts were negatively impacted. It was during this time that she created her TikTok account. Her father had been the one to install the Internet in schools in the village, and her parents encouraged her to continue posting online about their culture. As of 2024, she had 86,000 followers on Instagram and 6.6 million on TikTok. After Gomez began using TikTok, other members of her community began to use social media as well, which she said was a "movement to break taboos" and increase understanding among the general public of the lives of indigenous Brazilians. Her content increased the visibility and economic growth of her community, and her village now has an artesian well and running water in every home. In 2021, The Washington Post said that she was "one of the most dynamic and fastest-growing social media presences in Brazil".

In 2024, on International Women's Day, Mattel released a limited-edition Barbie doll depicting Gomez as part of their Role Models line of dolls. The line includes dolls depicting nine women deemed to be role models from different countries. The doll depicting Gomez wears traditional Tatuyo face paint and clothing. She was also featured as one of the top creators of 2026 in the Forbes Top Creators list.
