= Anna Veronica Mautner =

Brazilian psychoanalyst, journalist, university teacher (1935-2019)

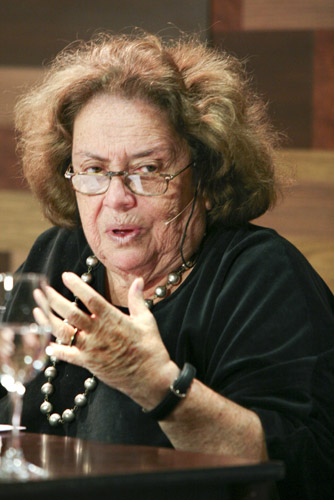
- Born: 1935; Pest County, Hungary
- Died: January 30, 2019 (aged 83–84); São Paulo
- Employer: University of São Paulo
- Known for: writing
- Children: three

Anna Veronica Mautner (1935 – January 30, 2019) was a Brazilian psychoanalyst, writer and a professor at the University of São Paulo.

== Life ==
Mautner was born in 1935 in Pest County in Hungary, moving to Brazil at the age of three. Her mother, Rosa, was a feminist and Jewish communist who arrived in Brazil as war was declared in 1939. She was brought up in Lapa where her family ran a hairdressing business.

Mautner was a Zionist and feminist. She became a professor of social psychology at University of São Paulo (USP) which is where she had studied social science. She did not become a psychoanalyst until the 1980s but she was to have a long career. She was an associate member of the Sociedade Brasileira de Psicanálise de São Paulo.

In 2000 she became a columnist for the Folha de S.Paulo newspaper. She wrote a point of view for Psicologia where she discussed how recognition of people's skills is a powerful driver for achievement. She noted that not everyone desires this as she said that there is not enough for everyone at the top of a pyramid. A shape that allows this is not a pyramid but a cobblestone.

In the last year of her life, Regina Favre, arranged for the publication of her last book which was an anthology of her work explaining her success. Mautner died in São Paulo in 2019 of multiple organ failure.

== Private life ==
Mautner had three children and, at the time of her death, five grandchildren.

== Works include ==
- Em busca do feminino: ensaios psicanalíticos, 1993
- A Cidadania em construção: uma reflexao transdisciplinar, 1994
- O cotidiano nas entrelinhas : crônicas e memórias, 2001
- Vínculos amorosos contemporâneos : psicodinâmica das novas estruturas familiares, 2003
- Ceu da Boca: lembranças de refeições da infância,
- Educação ou o quê?: Reflexões para pais e professores, (Education or what ?: Reflections for parents and teachers), 2015
- Fragmentos de uma vida (Fragments of a life), 2018
