= João Carlos Di Genio =

Brazilian physician and educator (1939–2022)

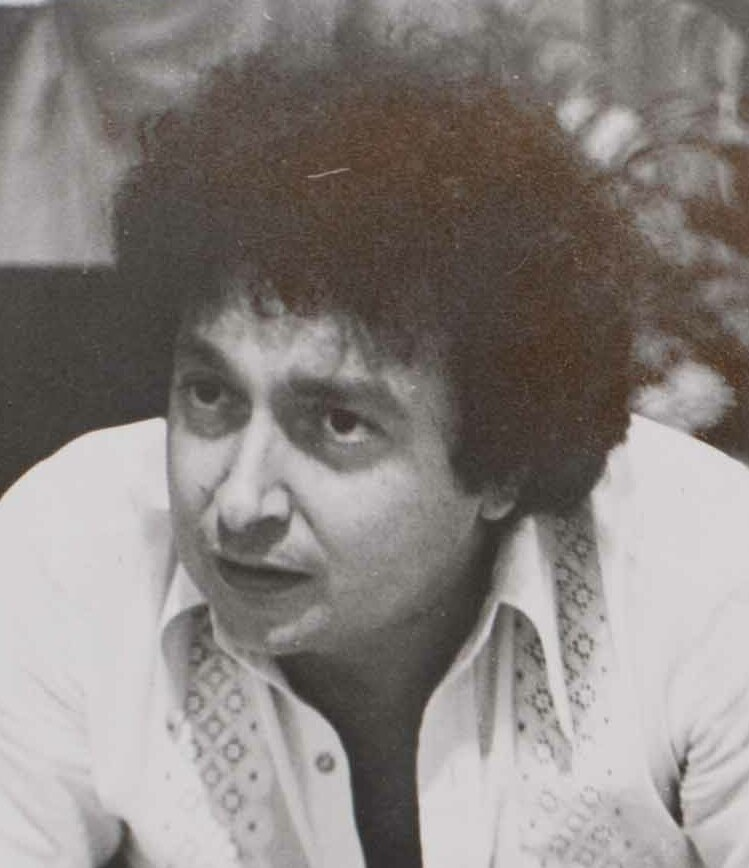
Image of João Carlos Di Genio

João Carlos Di Genio (27 February 1939 – 12 February 2022) was a Brazilian physician and educator. He created and was the main owner of the largest educational holding in the country, comprising the Sistema Objetivo (primary, secondary and preparatory schools) and the Universidade Paulista (UNIP), a private university with more than 60 campuses all over Brazil.

== Education and career ==
Born in Brazil, Di Genio started his educational career while he was a medical student at the University of São Paulo, in São Paulo in the 1960s. The mandatory entrance examination to the medical schools was increasingly tougher for many high school students. The inborn entrepreneurial spirit of di Genio led him to create a one-year preparatory pre-med course, initially in his own home. The success achieved by the course prompted him to establish a formal school, together with three of his colleagues (Drauzio Varella, Tadasi Ito and Roger Patti), which was named Curso Pré-Vestibular Nove de Julho. This later became the Objetivo prep course. Other educational levels were subsequently added.

== Death ==
Di Genio died in São Paulo on 12 February 2022, at the age of 82.
