= Tufi Duek =

Brazilian fashion designer

Tufi Duek (born May 31, 1954, in Nilópolis, Rio de Janeiro, Brazil) is a Brazilian fashion designer and creator of the Triton and Forum brands, marketed outside Brazil as Tufi Duek, which have an international following.

== Information ==
Tufi Duek has become one of the most iconic jeanswear labels in his home country, Brazil. Although he is famous for his jeans, his brand is also well known for the more sophisticated evening dresses. His most popular labels are "Forum" and "Triton". The Forum label is derived from sensuality while the Triton label revolves around the ideas of preppy and young. He also has a six-year contract with the art director, Giovanni Bianco.
