= Arne Ragnar Enge =

Arne Ragnar Enge was a Brazilian doctor, journalist, athlete and physical education teacher.

Born in the city of Campinas to a family of Scandinavian immigrants, Enge was Secretary-General of Grupo Folha—Brazil's biggest newspaper—for more than a decade. He also founded the University of São Paulo's Physical Education School and for more than 50 years was one of the most respected pediatricians in the country.

Enge was also an important athlete in Brazil, having been awarded several titles in swimming, and trained Maria Lenk, Brazil's greatest swimmer, in her early career.
