= Ricardo Samuel Goldstein =

Brazilian businessman

- Born: May 10, 1966 (age 60); Rio de Janeiro, RJ, Brazil
- Education: Harvard Business School; Universidade Santa Ursula
- Occupation: Businessman
- Years active: 30

Ricardo Samuel Goldstein (born May 10, 1966, in Rio de Janeiro), commonly known as Samuel Goldstein, is a Brazilian businessman and founder of a number of companies in varied fields, such as Security Beverages Americas, consulting and advisory company Gold & Bell, and Trump Realty Brazil (co-founded with Donald Trump).
