= Zola Amaro =

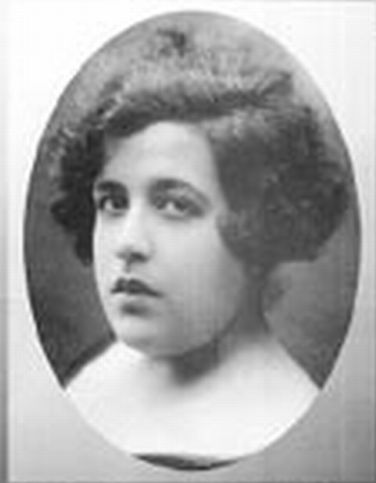
Zola Amaro

Zola Amaro (born Risoleta de la Mazza Simões Lopes; 26 January 1891 – 14 May 1944) was an early Brazilian operatic soprano. She made her debut in on 4 September 1919 in the title role of Aida at the Thetro Municipal in Rio de Janeiro, receiving high critical acclaim. She was the first South American to perform at Milan's La Scala where she appeared under the baton of Arturo Toscanini in 1924. Amoro is considered to have been one of Brazil's most outstanding performers, both at home and abroad.

== Biography ==
Born in Pelotas on 26 January 1891, Risoleta de la Mazza Simões Lopes was the daughter of Evaristo Simões Lopes and his wife Francisca Jerónima de la Maza. She married Antonio Amaro da Silveira with whom she had three children. After training in both Brazil and Argentina, she made her dëbut on 4 September 1919 in Rio de Janeiro as Aida, receiving enthusiastic acclaim from the critic Oscar Guanabarino.

She firmly established her reputation in Rio de Janeiro by excelling in the difficult role of Norma in the opera by Vincenzo Bellini, confirming Amelita Galli-Curci's prediction that she would be "the greatest Norma in the world". Other successes included leading roles in La Gioconda, Don Carlos, Il trovatore, Cavalleria Rusticana and Tosca.

She retired from the stage in 1932, suffering from poor health, but returned to make a short but unsuccessful appearance in 1936. Zola Amaro died on 14 May 1944 in Pelotas.
