= Elisabete Oliveira =

Brazilian educator, and researcher

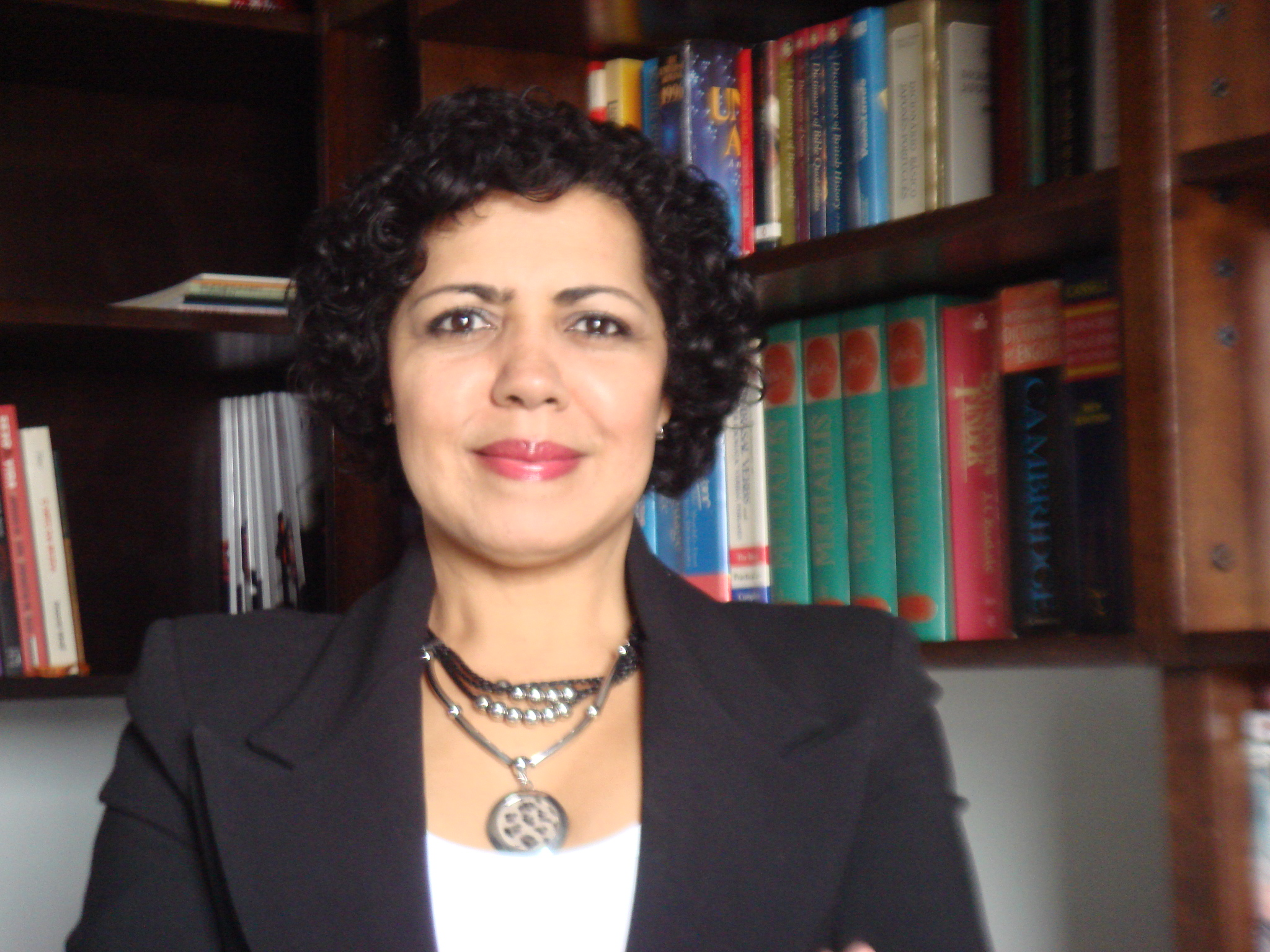
- Elisabete Oliveira in 2012
- Born: Elisabete Regina Baptista de Oliveira; November 27, 1962; São Paulo, Brazil
- Died: January 5, 2019 (aged 56)
- Occupations: Educator; Researcher

Elisabete Regina Baptista de Oliveira (27 November 1962 – 5 January 2019) was a Brazilian educator, and researcher. She held a doctorate in sociology of education, and was a leading researcher on asexuality in Brazil.

== Early life ==
Elisabete Regina Baptista de Oliveira earned a Bachelor of Letters degree from the Sant'Anna University (pt) in 1985 and later graduated in Pedagogy from the University of São Paulo in 2010. She obtained a master's degree in education from the Faculty of Education of the University of São Paulo in 2007 and a doctorate in sociology of education from the same institution in 2014.

== Career ==
Oliveira lived in Japan for several years and worked as a teacher, translator, and interpreter of English and Portuguese. From 2002, she started working with non-governmental organizations, research institutes, and government agencies, and conducted educational research and teacher-training activities in the fields of youth studies, sexuality, gender relations, sexual diversity, and human rights. Her master's dissertation, defended in 2007, examined the affective, sexual, and reproductive trajectories of young women from lower-income backgrounds in the city of São Paulo.

In 2010, she began her doctoral research on asexuality—the sexuality of people who have no interest in sexual activity—studying the life trajectories of individuals who self-identify as asexual and the process through which they came to adopt that identity.

Oliveira co-authored the book Minorias Sexuais: Direitos e Preconceitos ("Sexual Minorities: Rights and Prejudices"), edited by Tereza Rodrigues Vieira. In the book, she wrote a chapter on asexual people entitled Assexualidade e medicalização na mídia televisiva norte-americana ("Asexuality and medicalization in North American television media"). The book was launched on 5 June 2012 at Livraria Cultura.

== Media appearances ==
Oliveira was invited to discuss the topic of asexualty on the program Gabi Quase Proibida, hosted by Marília Gabriela, which aired on 17 July 2013. She was interviewed by sexologist Lelah Monteiro on Just TV, in an interview that was broadcast live on the internet on 3 February 2014.

In 2015, Oliveira was interviewed by the magazine Época, and by UNIVESP TV, where she discussed her doctoral thesis Minha vida de ameba ("My Life as an Amoeba").
