= Isabella Melo =

Brazilian model (born 1993)

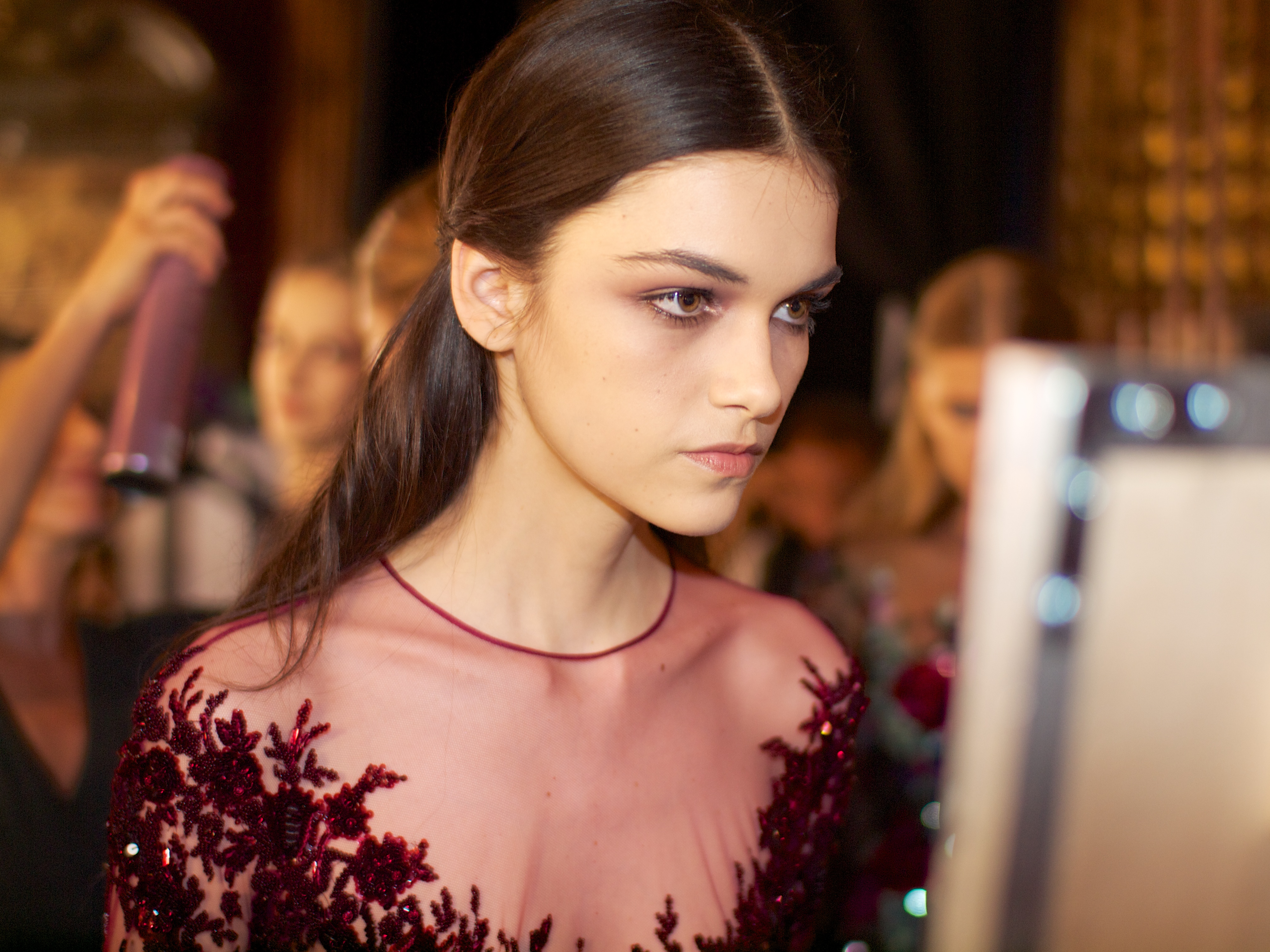
- Isabella Melo in 2012
- Born: Isabella Melo Assis Costa; April 18, 1993 (age 32); Recife, Pernambuco, Brazil
- Other names: Isa
- Occupation: Model
- Years active: 2009–present
- Modeling information
- Height: 1.79 m (5 ft 10 in)
- Hair color: Brown
- Eye color: Hazel brown
- Agency: IMG Models (New York, Paris, Sydney); Bon Image Corp. (Tokyo)

Isabella Melo Assis Costa (born April 18, 1993) is a Brazilian model.

== Early life ==
Melo was born on April 18, 1993, at Recife, Pernambuco, Brazil. Melo started modeling early at 15, when she was already taking the first steps in national catwalks. In 2012, Melo performed in the New York Fashion Week, London, Milan and Paris with 53 fashion shows for brands like Chanel, Dolce & Gabbana and Lacoste. She was the October 2012 Vogue Girl in Korea.

== Career ==
Melo has worked for brands such as Givenchy, John Galliano, Emporio Armani, Giorgio Armani, Just Cavalli, Kenzo, Oscar de la Renta and Vivienne Westwood. Melo models with several agencies as Ford Models Brasil, Premier Model Management, Mega Models and Women Management.
