= Luiz Loures =

Deputy Executive Director of UNAIDS

Dr Luiz Loures was the Deputy Executive Director, Joint United Nations Programme on HIV/AIDS (UNAIDS). He was appointed to this position at the level of Assistant Secretary-General of the United Nations by the United Nations Secretary-General Ban Ki-moon on 14 December 2012.

== Biography ==
Dr. Loures started as a critical care physician at the Hospital Joao XXIII in Belo Horizonte, Brazil, and later on moved to the rank of chief physician of the AIDS unit. Shortly afterwards he was appointed to the National AIDS Programme in Brazil and initiated the landmark HIV treatment programme, one of the first to offer universal access to HIV treatment for all patients in the country. He joined UNAIDS in 1996 when it was created. He is a globally recognised public health leader, who has combined scientific knowledge, first hand medical expertise, grassroots activism and political diplomacy to transform the AIDS response globally and nationally in the last three decades.

As the deputy executive director for programmes, Dr Luiz Loures shaped the UNAIDS agenda and framework for ending AIDS by 2030 based on scientific data and programme implementation evidence. A practitioner of human rights and gender equality, he championed leadership of communities for service delivery and forged partnerships between communities, civil society, faith leaders, health care providers and governments to unblock barriers to access to lifesaving health services.

In November 2016, Loures was reported internally by a UNAIDS employee for sexual harassment that allegedly took place in May 2015. An initial internal investigation cleared him of wrongdoing, but a second investigation was initiated after the employee went public with a complaint in 2018. The findings of the second investigation found him guilty. Dr Loures retired from UNAIDS in March 2018 following 22 years of service to the United Nations.
