= Vladimir Seixas =

Brazilian film director

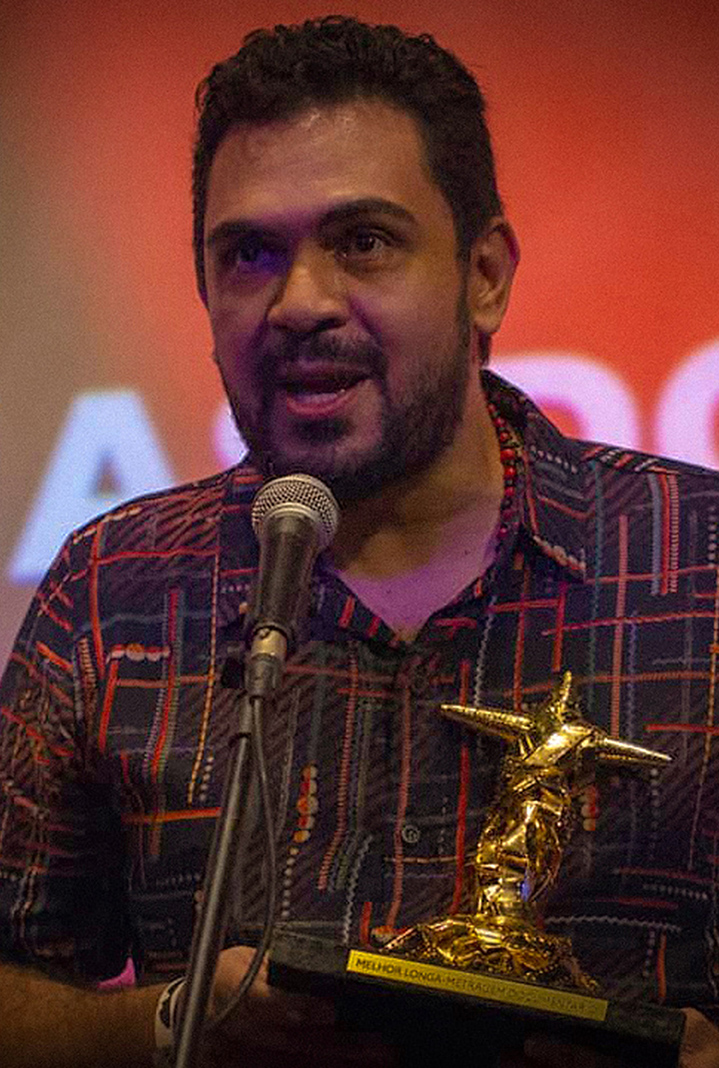
- Vladimir at the Rio de Janeiro International Film Festival in 2021.
- Born: 11 February 1981 (age 45); Rio de Janeiro, Brazil
- Education: Rio de Janeiro State University
- Occupations: Film director; producer; screenwriter
- Years active: 2008 – present

Vladimir Seixas (born 11 February 1981) is a Brazilian filmmaker and International Emmy nominee for best documentary. Vladimir has been working since 2008 on documentary direction and script. His films investigate the social, political and cultural transformations in Brazil in recent years from the social and collective urban movements and also from the behavior of the crowds. His debut short "Hiato" (Hiatus) was selected for several film festivals in the world, where he received 12 awards. He directed the film "A Primeira Pedra" (The First Stone – The Rise of Lynching in Brazil), winner of TAL - Latin America TV on DocMontevideo for best documentary, winner of the bronze medal in the Human Rights category of the New York Festivals - TV & Film and was nominated for an 47th International Emmy Awards in 2019. Vladimir Seixas directed five short films, two feature films, a series and a telefilm, participating in more than 50 film and TV festivals around the world where he received several awards.

== Filmography ==
- Rolê – Stories of Brazilian Protests in Malls (Rolê – Histórias dos Rolezinhos - 2021). Feature film.
- The First Stone – The Rise of Lynching in Brazil (A Primeira Pedra - 2018). Feature film.
- Uproar (Vozerio - 2015). Feature film.
- Behind the Door (Atrás da Porta - 2010). Feature film.
- In the Shadow of the Marquise (À Sombra da Marquise - 2010). Short film.
- Black Noise (Ruído Negro - 2009). Short film.
- In between (Entre - 2009). Short film.
- Shock (Choque - 2009). Short film.
- Hiatus (Hiato - 2008). Short film.

== Awards ==
- 2021: Rio de Janeiro International Film Festival
1. Rolê - Stories of Brazilian Protests in Malls - Best Documentary (winner)
- 2021: Olhar de Cinema - Curitiba International Film Festival
1. Rolê - Stories of Brazilian Protests in Malls - Special Jury Prize (winner)
2. Rolê - Stories of Brazilian Protests in Malls - Audience Award (winner)
- 2019: Emmy Internacional
1. The First Stone - Best Documentary (nominee)
- 2019: New York Festivals World's Best TV & Films
1. The First Stone - Best Human Rights Documentary - (bronze medal)
- 2019: DocMontevideo 2019 - TAL - Latin America TV
1. The First Stone - Best Documentary (winner)
- 2017: 8th Pitching Doc Futura
1. The First Stone - Best Documentary (winner)
- 2016: CachoeiraDoc
1. Uproar - Best Documentary (winner)
- 2016: Atlantidoc - Uruguay
1. Uproar - Best Documentary (nominee)
- 2015: Semana dos Realizadores
1. Uproar - Best Feature (nominee)
- 2010: CachoeiraDoc
1. Behind the Door - Best Feature by Young Jury (winner)
- 2008: 30th Havana Film Festival - Cuba
1. Hiatus - Latin American Exhibition (nominee)
- 2008: 36th Gramado Festival
1. Hiatus - Best Short (nominee)
