= Kat Torres =

Brazilian human trafficker

- Born: Katiuscia Torres Soares; Belém, Pará, Brazil
- Occupation(s): Model and social media influencer
- Criminal charges: Human trafficking and slavery
- Criminal penalty: Eight years in prison

Katiuscia Torres Soares (born October 24, 1988) known as Kat Torres, is a Brazilian convicted human trafficker, former model and social media influencer.

== Biography ==
Torres grew up in Brazil and began competing in pageants and modelling at a young age. She moved to the US and attracted media attention when she was pictured with Leonardo DiCaprio, although he denied she was close to him. She started an Instagram account. Her content there and on her website, and in self-help videos and a subscription service focused on relationships, wellness, business success and spirituality. She recommended hypnosis, meditation and exercise programs and offered personal consultations while asserting she had spiritual powers.

She published an autobiography A Voz, (The Voice) in which she discussed communicating with mysterious voices that only she could hear and claimed an ability to predict the future.

Multiple women alleged that they were sexually exploited, enslaved and imprisoned by Torres, who had encouraged them to leave their lives in Brazil and join her in the US. Torres was found guilty of human trafficking and slavery in July 2024, following an FBI investigation into the whereabouts of two women who came from Brazil and lived with Torres, and was sentenced to eight years in prison.
