= Jorge Sá Earp =

- Born: 1955 (age 70–71); Rio de Janeiro, Rio de Janeiro, Brazil
- Occupations: Diplomat, poet, short story writer, and novelist
- Writing career
- Literary movement: Post-Modernism

Jorge Sá Earp (Rio de Janeiro, 25 June 1955) is a Brazilian writer, poet, and diplomat. He graduated in literature from PUC-Rio.

== Biography ==
Jorge Sá Earp graduated in literature from the Pontifícia Universidade Católica do Rio de Janeiro (PUC-Rio).

As a diplomat, he represented Brazil in several countries, including Poland, the Netherlands, Gabon, Belgium, Romania, Ecuador, Costa Rica, and Italy. He is also a member of the National Association of Writers and is recognized as one of the most prominent voices in contemporary Brazilian literature.

One of the most distinctive features of his literature is his ability to tell stories fluently, establishing an immediate connection with readers. Between the lines, the author's vast erudition becomes evident as he explores a variety of topics related to the arts and culture with lightness and grace. Additionally, homoeroticism is a recurring theme in his short stories and novels, treated naturally and reflecting the diversity and complexity of human relationships, while navigating the realms of realism, naturalism, and romanticism.

Sá Earp's literary production encompasses poetry, short stories, and novels. Among his poetic works, Feixe de Lenha (1980) and Passagem Secreta (1993) stand out. In prose, Earp published No Caminho do Vento (1983) and O Ninho (1986) and gained recognition for titles such as Ponto de Fuga (1995), winner of the Nestlé Literature Prize, Areias Pretas (2004), O Novelo (2008), and As Marés de Tuala (2010). More recently, he has released As Amarras (2020), O Fio da Seda (2023), and O Veranista (2024).

The writer often uses Rio de Janeiro as the central setting of his narratives, capturing the essence of the city across different periods. In O Fio da Seda (2023), he revisits the romantic Rio of the 1960s and 1970s, crafting a coming-of-age novel in which the protagonist matures through his choices and personal discoveries.

His work is characterized by psychological depth, a keen awareness of temporal transformations, and a sensitive approach to the contradictions of Brazilian identity, establishing itself as a significant contribution to both the national and international literary landscape.

Jorge Sá Earp gained academic recognition through the work of Italian researcher Alessandra Damin, from the Università degli Studi di Padova, who devoted her studies to his short story collection Areias Pretas (2004). Damin describes Sá Earp's prose as "ethereal and undefined," characterized by characters who conceal their true feelings and thoughts. This quality gives his narratives a fragmented nature, often disrupting logical thought and the traditional linear sequence.

== Published works ==
  - Feixe de Lenha (Poetry - Self-published, 1980)
  - No Caminho do Vento (Short stories - Ed. Alfa-Ômega, 1983)
  - O Ninho (Novel, Ed. Achiamé, 1986)
  - Sudoeste (Novel, Ed. Achiamé, 1991)
  - Passagem Secreta (Poetry, Ed. Taurus, 1993)
  - Ponto de Fuga (Novel, Ed. Paz e Terra, VI Nestlé Literature Prize, 1995)
  - O Cavalo Marinho (Short stories, Ed. 7Letras, 1997)
  - O Jogo dos Gatos Pardos (Novel, Ed. Eldorado, 2001)
  - A Cidade e as Cinzas (Novel, Ed. Razão Cultural, 2002)
  - Areias Pretas (Short stories, Ed. 7Letras, 2004)
  - O Olmo e a Palmeira (Novel, Ed. 7Letras, 2006)
  - O Legado (Novel, Ed. 7Letras, 2007)
  - O Novelo (Novel, Ed. 7Letras, 2008)
  - As Marés de Tuala (Novel, Ed. 7Letras, 2010)
  - Bandido e Mocinho (Short stories, Ed. 7Letras, 2012)
  - Quatro em Cartago (Novel, Ed. 7Letras, 2016)
  - A Praça do Mercado (Short stories, Ed. 7Letras, 2018)
  - As Amarras (Novel, Ed. 7Letras, 2020)
  - O Fio da Seda (Novel, Ed. 7Letras, 2023)
  - O Veranista (Short stories, Ed. 7Letras, 2024)

== Awards received ==
Awarded for the novel Ponto de Fuga by the Nestlé Foundation for Culture (1995).
