= Heinz Ebert =

German-Brazilian geologist

Heinz Eber
- Born: 13 October 1907; Saxony, German Empire
- Died: 26 April 1983 (aged 75); Rio Claro, São Paulo, Brazil
- Education: University of Leipzig
- Scientific career
- Fields: Geology; Natural History

Heinz Ebert (13 October 1907 in Chemnitz, Saxony – 26 April 1983 in Rio Claro, São Paulo, Brazil) was a German-Brazilian geologist, naturalist, and educator.

== Life ==
Ebert had his basic training in chemistry, physics, and analytical chemistry and natural sciences and served as geologist at the Geological Survey of Saxony (Geologisches Landesamt). He was obtained his PhD at the University of Leipzig in 1933, where he became an associate professor in 1934. He worked on petrography at the Geological Survey of Saxony and developed methods to recognize stratigraphic sequences by petrographic and structural analysis. From 1939 to 1946, World War II interrupted his geological activity. After the war he returned to geology and opened an office for applied geology (groundwater, drilling, economic geology, geology for dams, etc.) Ebert was married to Sophie Wagner, daughter of botanist Albert Wagner for whom the palm Trachycarpus Fortunei Wagnerianus is named.

He moved to Recife in 1950 and was influential in creating the CAGE (Campaign for Training Geologists). From 1950 to 1956, he was a "specialized geologist" at the Division of Geology and Mineralogy, which evolved from the old Geological Survey of Brazil, and mapped the regions of São João del Rei, Juiz de Fora, and Barbacena, a whole complex metasedimentary southern region of Minas Gerais. He was director of Sudene, training technicians in areas of groundwater in crystalline rocks.

In 1962 he moved to Rio Claro, São Paulo, to teach various subjects in the field of geosciences at the Faculty of Philosophy, Sciences and Letters of the Universidade Estadual Paulista Júlio de Mesquita Filho, assisting in the creation of the geology course. He continued his studies with attention to the south and southwest of the state of Minas Gerais. He made several trips abroad, bringing to Brazil contributions of his observations and contacts. He had many students, many of them becoming professors and continuing his work, especially in teaching mineralogy, petrology, structural geology, and the creation and maintenance of the Museum of Minerals and Rocks "Heinz Ebert". This museum has a vast collection that Ebert donated, including many didactic collections.

Ebert formed in Recife more graduate students. He published around 60 works on geosciences, especially of Brazil. Between 1977 and 1980 he also collaborated with the course of geology at the Universidade Federal de Mato Grosso.

In 1974, Ebert won the Jose Bonifacio Gold Medal of the Sociedade Brasileira de Geologia, the highest prize in Brazilian geology.

As a naturalist, Ebert had a passion for butterfly collection. He died in 1983, in Rio Claro, Brazil.

== Selected works ==
- Das Grundgebirge im Elbtale nördlich von Tetschen. (Leipzig, phil. thesis, 1933), – Abhandlungen d. Sächs. Geol. Landesamtes. H. 14 (1934).
- Die Elbtalzone und das Lausitzer Massiv im Bereiche des Kartenblattes Dresden. – Erläuterungen zur geologischen Karte Sachsen, No. 66: Blatt Dresden. 3. ed., Geologisches Landesamt, Leipzig 1934, pp. 9–50.
- with Wilhelm Jaeger: Erläuterungen zur geologischen Karte von Sachsen. No. 152: Blatt Klingenthal-Zwota. nebst einem kleinen Teil von Blatt 155, Landwüst. 2. ed., Geologisches Landesamt, Leipzig 1935.
- Das vortertiäre Grundgebirge des Kartenblattes Hirschfelde. – Erläuterungen zur geologischen Karte von Sachsen, No. 89: Blatt Hirschfelde. Geologisches Landesamt. Leipzig 1937, pp. 6–24.
- Das granitische Grundgebirge der östlichen Lausitz. habil. thesis (″Diss. phil. habil.″ of 13. Nov. 1940), Universität Leipzig, Leipzig 1943 (printed: Hirzel Verlag, Leipzig 1943).

== See also ==
List of geologists
