= Esther Flesch =

Brazilian lawyer (b. 1967)

- Born: Esther Miriam Flesch Sandoval; March 9, 1967 (age 58); São Paulo
- Education: Universidade de São Paulo
- Occupation: Lawyer
- Years active: 1988 - today
- Awards: 100 Women in Investigations 2015 - Global Investigations Review (GIR) – 2015
- Website: https://estherflesch.com.br

Esther Miriam Sandoval Flesch (São Paulo, March 9, 1967) is a Brazilian lawyer. Flesch is one of the most prominent lawyers in Brazil, and achieved recognition in international rankings such as Latin Lawyer, Latin American Corporate Counsel Association (LACCA), and Legal 500.

== Early life ==
She earned her doctorate from the University of São Paulo (USP).

== Career ==
She worked for the law firm Trench, Rossi e Watanabe (TRW) from 1989.

She participated in various conferences and lectures in Brazil and abroad.

== Court halts JBS case ==
On September 17 of 2019 the Federal Court of the 1st District (Tribunal Regional Federal da 1ª Região) accepted a motion to halt prosecution against lawyer Esther Flesch in the case involving the plea bargain deals of JBS executives. The court considered that the actions taken by Flesch were not criminal.

In 2018 Flesch had been mentioned in an inquiry of plea deals between JBS executives and the district attorney (DA) in Brazil.

In 2017 she sued the Trench Rossi Watanabe law firm after an episode in which former DA Marcello Miller was hired by Trench to participate in negotiations of plea deals with JBS. Amongst the reasons for the lawsuit were access to documents that the firm declined to provide.

In April 2018 her request was granted by the São Paulo Court of Law (TJSP). A report in the Folha de S. Paulo newspaper revealed that Flesch “was interviewed in the United States by four members of Baker McKenzie in a locked room for ten hours.” In the case, Flesch confirmed that the decision to hire the former DA was taken by a committee.

In December 2018, VEJA magazine disclosed that Esther Flesch's defence had proof, including an e-mail, that revealed that the administration of Trench Rossi Watanabe had knowledge of the deal made with JBS. This included a bill in the amount of 700,000 reals sent to the company by the firm.

== Recognition ==
In 2015 she was named one of the 100 most notable female lawyers worldwide in investigations and compliance by the Global Investigations Review (GIR) in the publication Women in Investigations 2015. According to the publication, the list includes "women considered the most notable in the investigations field worldwide and includes professionals working in law firms, companies and in the public sector."
