= Gustavo Brigagão =

Brazilian lawyer

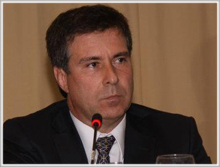
- Gustavo André Muller Brigagão
- Occupation: Tax lawyer

Gustavo André Muller Brigagão is a tax lawyer who specializes in indirect taxes and tax litigation. He is a senior partner at the law firm Ulhôa Canto. Brigagão was recognized by Chambers and Partners Latin America 2013 as one of the most individually admired lawyers in Brazil and has been mentioned in the publication since 2009. Ulhôa Canto, in which Gustavo Brigagão is one of the key partners, was appointed by the same publication as one of the country's leading tax law firms.

== Career ==
He is a lawyer and teaches postgraduate courses at Fundação Getúlio Vargas, and was also a law school professor at Cândido Mendes University from 1993 to 2005. He is a member of the General Council of International Fiscal Association, Secretary-General of the Brazilian Association of Financial Law, director of Institutional Relations of the Center of Studies of Law Firms, President of the British Chamber of Commerce of Rio de Janeiro and member of the Entrepreneurial Council of Foreign Chambers of Commerce of the Commercial Association. Brigagão is also a tax law columnist for the website Consultor Jurídico. He has drafted several bills and made a presentation to the Federal Senate on the Brazilian tax system in 2007.

Brigagão was in the discussion surrounding bills related to fixed taxation of professional partnerships, such as PL n. 70/03 9 and PL n. 144/1110; and the bill to increase the base of calculation of income tax in the presumed profit regime.

== Publications ==
Gustavo Brigagão is one of the tax issues columnists for Consultor Jurídico. Brigagão delivered these speeches on tax law, among others:

- "Transfer Pricing and Indirect Taxation", at the 61st IFA Conference in Kyoto, Japan on September 2, 2007
- "Transfer Pricing and Customs Valuation", at the 2nd regional IFA Conference, in Buenos Aires, Argentina, on April 7, 2010
- "Legal and Constitutional Aspects of the Oil and Gas Sector”, edited by Fundação Getúlio Vargas on April 17, 2010
- “Taxation in Telecommunications and related jurisprudence” in an ABETEL Seminar on October 10, 2005
- "Tax Penalties", at the XIII Minas Gerais International Congress on November 11, 2009
- “Changes in tax regulation and consequences to companies” during an event of the Brazilian Institute of Financial Executives (Instituto Brasileiro de Executivos Financeiros - IBFE-RIO) on October 7, 2004
- “Taxation restructuring and VAT” at the IX Pernambuco International Tax Law Congress on September 12, 2009
