= André Medici =

- Born: 28 February 1956; Rio de Janeiro, Brazil
- Occupation: Health Economist
- Employer: Inter-American Development Bank
- Notable work: El desafío de la descentralización; * Financiamiento público de la Salud en Brasil                 * Evaluating Social Security Reform in Argentina during the 1990s                 * Family Spending on Health in Brazil                 * Financing Health Policies in Brazil                 * Globalization, Transmissible Diseases and Inequity                 * Health Policies and Economic Blocks                 * La respuesta del BID a los riesgos de la influenza aviar en América Latina y el Caribe                 * Public and Private Health Financing in Latin American and The Caribbean during the Nineties: A Brief Analysis                 * Report of the Consultation to Support the Inter-American Development Bank's Health Strategy * The Political Economy of Reform in Brazil's Civil Servant Pension Scheme
- Spouse: Fatima (married 1978)
- Children: Camila (born 1982)

André Medici (born 28 February 1956, in Rio de Janeiro) is a Brazilian health economist with a background in health strategy, public and private health financing in Latin America and the Caribbean, social security and pensions, economic reform, gender health issues, environmental protection, and globalization. He is currently a Senior Health Specialist at the Inter-American Development Bank, in Washington, DC.

== Family ==
Medici was born into a well-known family who had migrated to Brazil from Italy. He married his first girlfriend, Fatima, in 1978. In 1982, his only child was born, a daughter, Camila.

== Career ==
Medici played a part on the planning, development and implementation of the Sistema Único de Saúde (SUS - Unitary System of Health) which allows underprivileged Brazilians to have access to health care and prescription medication. He currently focuses on drafting and implementing health care reforms in various Latin American countries via the Inter American Development Bank.

Medici is a senior health specialist of the Sustainable Development Department of the Inter American Development Bank (IDB). In Brazil, he occupied several public positions as Deputy Director of Population and Social Indicators of the Brazilian Institute of Geography and Statistics (1985-1986), Co-ordinator of Post Graduation Courses of the National School of Statistics (1991); Director of Social Policy Studies of the Institute of Public Sector Economy (1992-1994). He was also a professor and researcher at the Department of Economy and Sociology of the Catholic University of Rio de Janeiro (1980-1989) and the National School of Public Health (1981-1991). His current academic activities include courses in the Latin American Center of Human Economy (CLAEH) in Uruguay and in the University of São Paulo (USP), Brazil, where he is teaching leading subjects in health economics in post-graduate courses, and special seminars at George Washington University. Medici is also a member in Braudel Institute of World Economics, a São Paulo-based think tank.

== Publications ==
Among his published work, including books and hundreds of papers, are:

- El desafío de la descentralización:
- Financiamiento público de la Salud en Brasil;
- Evaluating Social Security Reform in Argentina during the 1990s;
- Family Spending on Health in Brazil;
- Financing Health Policies in Brazil;
- Globalization, Transmissible Diseases and Inequity;
- Health Policies and Economic Blocks;
- La respuesta del BID a los riesgos de la influenza aviar en América Latina y el Caribe;
- Public and Private Health Financing in Latin American and The Caribbean during the Nineties: A Brief Analysis;
- Report of the Consultation to Support the Inter-American Development Bank's Health Strategy;
- The Political Economy of Reform in Brazil's Civil Servant Pension Scheme.
