= Romulo Pires =

Brazilian male model (born 1983)

Rômulo Pires
- Born: June 6, 1983 (age 41); Ceilândia, DF, Brazil
- Modeling information
- Height: 1.88 m (6 ft 2 in)
- Hair color: Brown
- Eye color: Green

Rômulo Pires (born June 6, 1983) is a Brazilian male model. Pires is of Italian and Brazilian ancestry and was born in Ceilândia, DF, Brazil. According to Forbes, he was the fourth-most successful male model in the world in 2004–2005.

Pires was working as a mechanic when a woman with a flat tire said he was attractive and had the skill for modeling. He subsequently entered a model search held by Elite Model Management of Brazil and won the first place. However, his modeling career stalled until designer Karl Lagerfeld took notice of him two years later.

Before walking his first runway, Pires was hired to appear in high-profile campaigns for Chanel and Lagerfeld Gallery. With Lagerfeld's support, Pires traveled around the world and started to build his portfolio and reputation. Ad campaigns for Gucci, Valentino, Pepe Jeans, Cavali Classic, Carolina Herrera, Christian Lacroix, Ck1, Laura Biagiotti, and Emanuel Ungaro followed. He was in People magazine as one of the sexiest men alive in 2006 and worked with Helmut Newton.

Pires is quoted as saying that he enjoys modeling because of the job's perks, stating, "You get to travel the world, and it is always free. You get to know different places, and I have learned English and a bit of Italian and French as well." In his spare time, Pires attends acting class and cooking class, practises birkram yoga and plays soccer.

He is married to Thaís Dos Santos, a Brazilian model based in New York City. They have a son, Roman, born in November 2016.
