= Izabel Pimentel =

Brazilian sailor

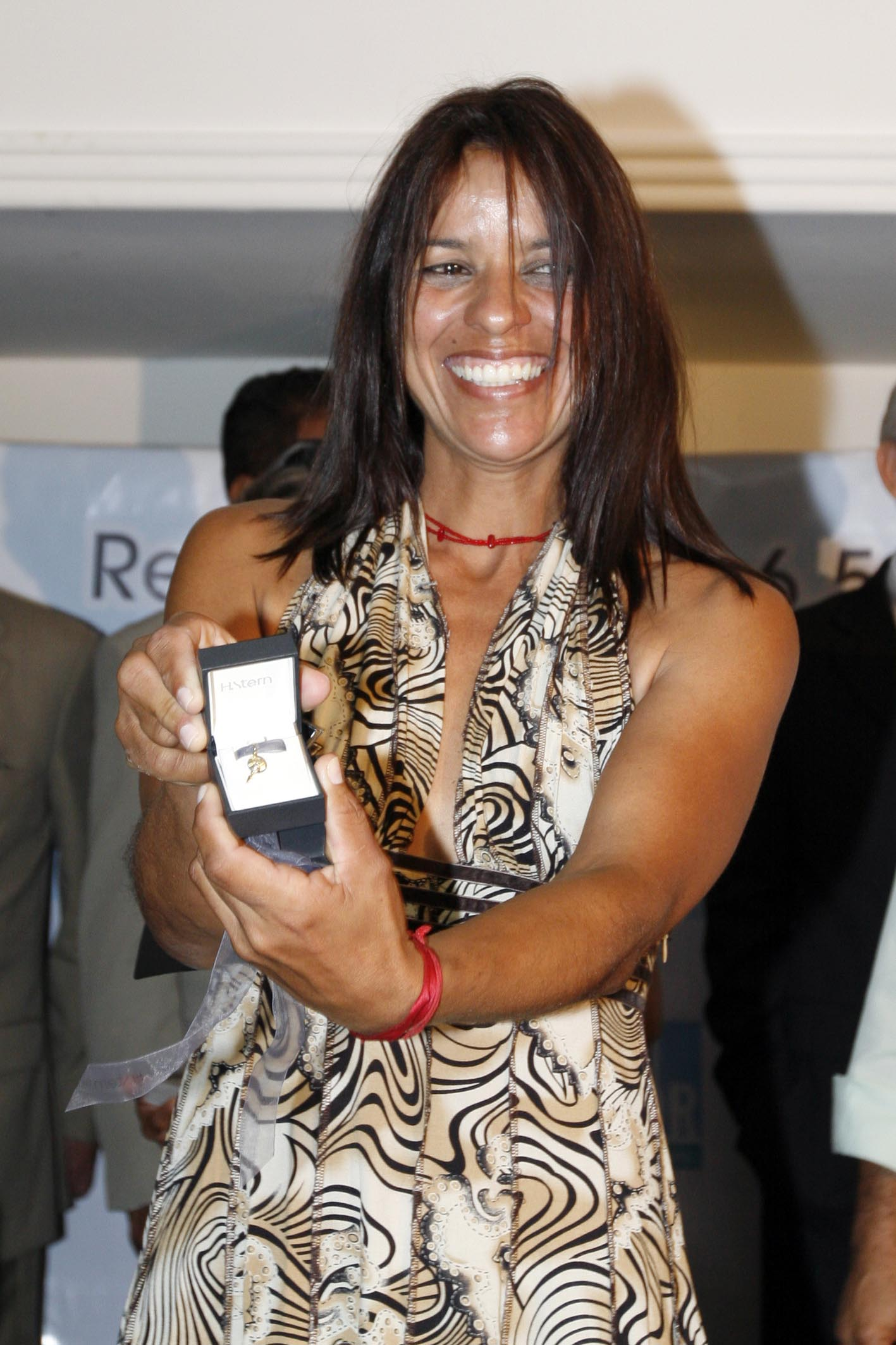
- Brazilian sailor Izabel Pimentel (2009)
- Born: Mato Grosso do Sul, Brazil
- Occupation: Sailor

Izabel Pimentel, born in Mato Grosso do Sul, Brazil, is the first Brazilian and Latin American to sail solo around the world. In 2006, she became the first Brazilian sailor to cross the Atlantic Ocean solo, a journey that lasted 42 days and 6 hours. She set off on 10 July from Cascais, Portugal and arrived in Fortaleza, Brazil on 21 August. In total, Pimentel sailed in a 21-foot (6.5-meter) Mini-Transat 5,300 miles (9,500 km).

== Voyages ==
Pimentel became the first Brazilian sailor to cross the Atlantic Ocean solo in 2006. She was unable to take part in the Mini-Transat race the following year but in 2008, she set off from Sète, France and made her second Atlantic crossing becoming the first Brazilian to take part in the Refeno, the trip from Recife, Brazil - Fernando de Noronha Oceanic Regatta, solo. She was joined on this race by her cat Petit Eric.

In January 2009, she sailed from Paraty, Brazil for France, making her third crossing of the Atlantic. That same year, she became the first Brazilian to take part in the transoceanic race called Transat 6.50, solo. With this crossing, Pimentel completed four Atlantic crossings on a 21-foot boat and traveled more than 28,000 miles solo.

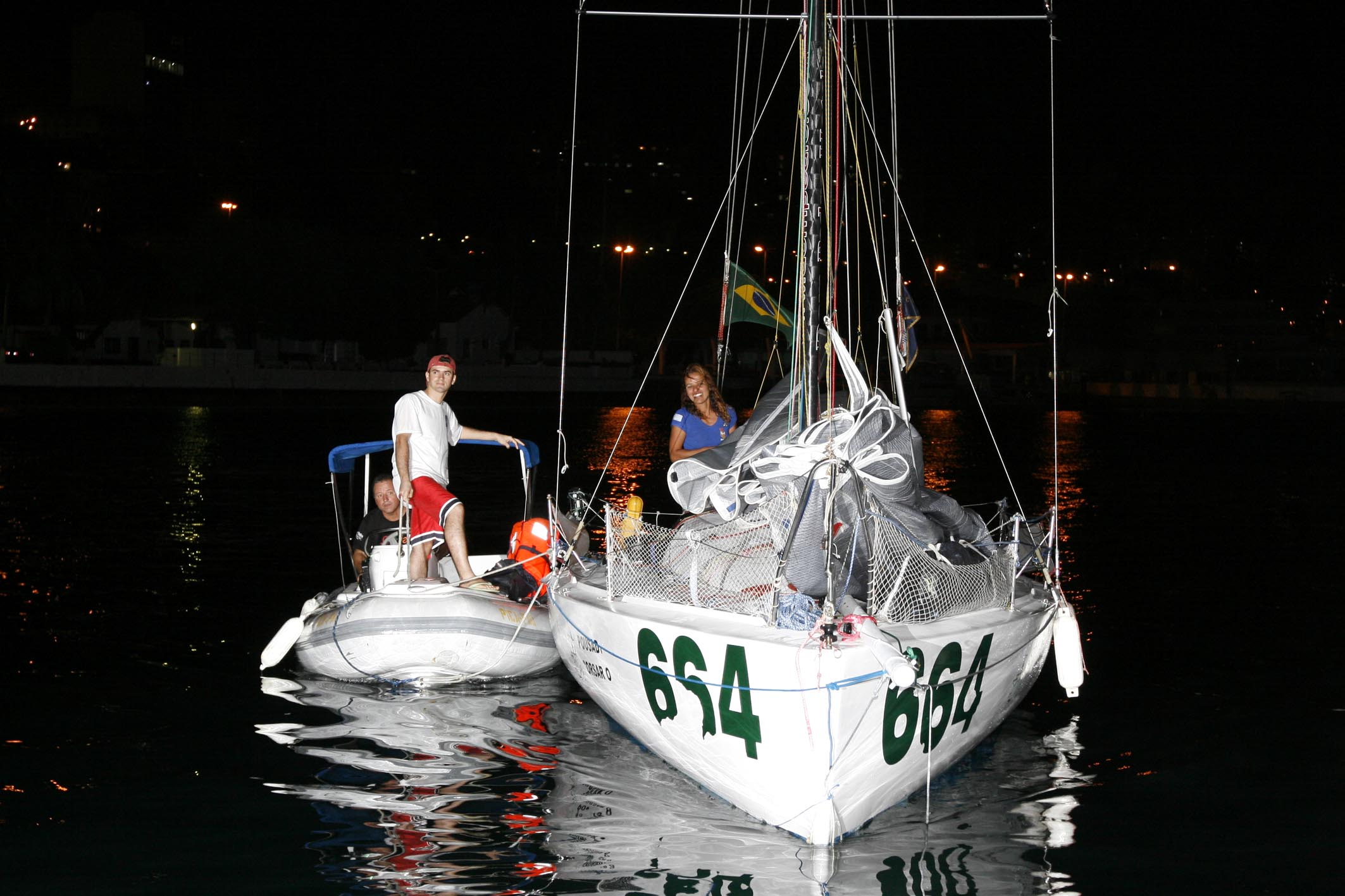
Izabel Pimentel on her boat (2009)

In August 2012, Pimentel set off on her first round-the-world trip, again from the French city of Sète. This trip would be made in three stages: the first stage comprised the stretch from Europe to Brazil; the second stage would be the circumnavigation of the globe alone and without stopovers Brazil-Brazil, at latitudes close to 40ºS, crossing the Atlantic, Indian and Pacific Oceans, and passing by the Cape of Good Hope and Cape Horn; and the third stage, the return from Brazil to France, ending the round-the-world trip with the arrival at her port of departure, in the city of Sète, France.

In December 2012, Pimentel began her attempt. She set off from the city of Paraty, Brazil, aboard the 34-foot aluminium-hulled sailboat "Don." The planned route of this adventure included going around the Cape of Good Hope, Cape Leeuwin and Cape Horn before returning to Brazil. Pimentel, however, ended up capsizing her boat in the Pacific Ocean. As a result, she was forced to change her route to go to Easter Island to assess the damage to the boat's structure, thus interrupting her goal of becoming the first Brazilian sailor to complete a solo, nonstop round-the-world trip. However, in 2014, by completing the circumnavigation, Pimentel became the first Brazilian and South American woman to undertake such a challenge with stopovers.

== Selected works ==
She has written five books.

- Pimentel, Izabel, Travessia de Uma Mulher (Em Portugues do Brasil), Portuguese Brazilian Edition, 1 Jan. 2008
