= List of Brazilian scientists =

This is a list of Brazilian scientists, those born in Brazil or who have established citizenship or residency there.

- Manuel de Abreu (1894–1962), physician, inventor of abreugraphy (mass radiography of the lungs for screening tuberculosis)
- Aziz Ab'Saber (1924–2012), geographer; geologist; ecologist recognized for the Theory of Refuges and Amazon studies; former president of the SBPC
- Fernando Flávio Marques de Almeida (1916–2013), geologist
- Carlos Paz de Araújo, scientist and inventor, holds nearly 600 patents in the area of nanotechnology
- José Márcio Ayres (1954–2003), biologist, zoologist, primatologist
- Marcia Barbosa (born 1960), physicist
- Abrahão de Moraes (1916–1970), astronomer and mathematician
- Eddy Bensoussan (born 1938), physician
- Wilson Teixeira Beraldo (1917–1998), co-discoverer of bradykinin
- Thaisa Storchi Bergmann (born 1955), astrophysicist at the Universidade Federal do Rio Grande do Sul
- Carlos Augusto Bertulani (born 1955), physicist
- Vital Brazil (1865–1950), physician and scientist, discoverer of the antivenom for snakes and other venomous animals
- Ennio Candotti (1942–2023), physicist and scientific leader
- Fernando Henrique Cardoso (born 1931), sociologist and former President
- José Cândido de Melo Carvalho (1914–1994), biologist, zoologist, entomologist
- Guilherme "Bill" Cardoso, Brazilian-American entrepreneur, engineer, and scientist.
- Carlos Chagas (1879–1934), biologist, zoologist, public health worker
- Evandro Chagas (1905–1940), physician and biomedical scientist specialized in tropical medicine; son of Carlos Chagas
- Gauss Moutinho Cordeiro (born 1952), mathematician and statistician
- Vera Cordeiro (born 1950), social entrepreneur and physician
- Newton da Costa (1929–2024), mathematician and logician, recognised for his works in paraconsistent logic
- Oswaldo Cruz (1872–1917), physician and public health champion, eliminated yellow fever, bubonic plague and smallpox in Rio de Janeiro at the turn of the 20th century
- Johanna Döbereiner (1924–2000), biologist, discoverer of the nitrogen fixing role of soil bacteria
- Adolpho Ducke (1876–1959), Croatian-Brazilian biologist; zoologist; entomologist; botanist
- André Rodrigues Durães, Brazilian physician and researcher
- Florestan Fernandes (1920–1995), father of Brazilian sociology
- Sérgio Henrique Ferreira (1934–2016), physician and pharmacologist, discovered the active principle of a drug for hypertension
- Carlos Chagas Filho (1910–2000), physician and physiologist, former president of the Brazilian Academy of Sciences, former president of the Pontifical Academy of Sciences; son of Carlos Chagas
- Hércules Florence (1804–1879), pioneer of photography
- Santiago Americano Freire (1908–1997), physician and professor of pharmacology, psychiatrist, writer, painter
- Gilberto Freyre (1900–1987), historiographer and sociologist
- Celso Furtado (1920–2004), noted economist and ideologue of economy of developing nations
- Marcelo Gleiser (born 1959), physicist, writer and professor of physics and astronomy at the Dartmouth College since 1991
- José Goldemberg (born 1928), physicist, former Minister of Science & Technology and Dean of the University of São Paulo
- Émil Göldi (1859–1917), Swiss-Brazilian biologist; zoologist; naturalist
- Bartolomeu de Gusmão (1685–1724), Brazilian Catholic priest, pioneer of aviation, the inventor of the balloon, became known as the "flying priest"
- Jacques Hüber (1867–1914), Swiss-Brazilian biologist; botanist
- Ivan Izquierdo (1937–2021), physician and neuroscientist; discovered neural mechanisms of memory
- Jean Paul Jacob (1937–2019), electronic engineer, researcher and professor, research manager at the Almaden IBM Research Center, California
- Adib Jatene (1929–2014), heart surgeon
- Alexander Kellner (born 1961), Liechtensteinian/Brazilian paleontologist
- Warwick Estevam Kerr (1922–2018), geneticist, researcher on the biology and genetics of bees
- Eduardo Krieger (born 1928), physician and physiologist, former president of the Brazilian Academy of Sciences
- César Lattes (1924–2005), experimental physicist, co-discoverer of the pion, a type of subatomic particle, first president of the Brazilian National Research Council
- Napoleão Laureano (1914–1951), cancer researcher
- Aristides Leão (1914–1993), physician and physiologist, discovered Leão's depression, a phenomenon of nervous tissue
- Ângelo Moreira da Costa Lima (1887–1964), doctor, entomologist
- Henrique da Rocha Lima (1879–1956), physician, pathologist and infectologist, discovered Rickettsia prowazekii, the pathogen of epidemic typhus
- José Leite Lopes (1918–2006), theoretical physicist
- Adolfo Lutz (1855–1940), physician and pioneer of public health
- José Lutzenberger (1926–2002), ecologist and zoologist
- Roberto Landell de Moura (1861–1928), pioneer of telephony
- Fritz Müller (1821–1897), German-Brazilian biologist; zoologist; botanist; naturalist; entomologist
- Miguel Nicolelis (born 1961), neuroscientist, one of Scientific American's best scientists of 2004
- Jacob Palis (1940–2025), mathematician of international fame, president of the Brazilian Academy of Sciences
- Maurício Peixoto (1921–2019), engineer, mathematician, pioneered the studies on structural stability, author of Peixoto's theorem
- Domingos Soares Ferreira Penna (1818–1888), biologist, zoologist, naturalist
- José Aristodemo Pinotti (1934–2009), physician and gynecologist, former president of the International Federation of Gynecology and Obstetrics
- Marcos Pontes (born 1963), first Brazilian astronaut, Missão Centenário
- Patricia Pranke (born 1967), stem cell researcher, professor
- Ana Maria Primavesi (1920–2020), soil scientist and promoter of the ecological management of tropical soils
- André Rebouças (1838–1898), pioneer engineer, brother of Antônio Rebouças Filho
- José Reis (1907–2002), biologist, greatest Brazilian science writer
- Gilberto Righi (1937–1999), biologist, zoologist, specialist on earthworms
- Carlos Rittl (living), scientist and environmentalist
- Nora Tausz Rónai (born 1924), holocaust survivor, architect, writer and masters swimmer
- Milton Santos (1926–2001), geographer, won the Vautrin Lud International Geography Prize, the highest award that can be gained in the field of geography
- Alberto Santos-Dumont (1873–1932), aviator and inventor
- Ademar Agostinho Sauthier (1940), theologist
- Mário Schenberg (1914–1990), theoretical physicist
- Helmut Sick (1910–1991), German-Brazilian biologist; zoologist; ornithologist
- Lotar Siewerdt (born 1939), agronomist; forage production
- Manuel Augusto Pirajá da Silva (1873–1961), responsible for the identification and complete description of the pathogenic agent and the pathophysiological cycle of schistosomiasis disease
- Maurício Rocha e Silva (1910–1983), physician and pharmacologist, discovered bradykinin, an active cardiovascular peptide
- Emílio Joaquim da Silva Maia (1808–1859), physician and naturalist
- Nise da Silveira (1905–1999), psychiatrist and mental health reformer
- Jorge Stolfi (born 1950), computer scientist, professor at UNICAMP
- Jayme Tiomno (1920–2011), experimental and theoretical nuclear physicist
- Paulo Emílio Vanzolini (1924–2013), biologist, zoologist, herpetologist
- Glaci Zancan (1935–2007), biochemist
- Mayana Zatz (born 1947), biologist and geneticist
- Euryclides Zerbini (1912–1993), heart surgeon, pioneer of first heart transplant in Brazil

== Foreign scientists and engineers who lived or live in Brazil ==
- Alexander Grothendieck (1928–2014), French mathematician
- David Bohm (1917–1992), American physicist
- Gregory Chaitin (born 1947), Argentine-American mathematician
- Louis Couty (1854–1884), French physiologist and pharmacologist
- Miguel Rolando Covian (1913–1992), Argentinian physiologist
- Orville Adalbert Derby (1851–1915), American geologist
- Heinz Ebert (1907–1983), German geologist
- Luigi Fantappiè (1901–1956), Italian mathematician
- Richard Feynman (1918–1988), American physicist
- Carlos Hamilton Vasconcelos Araújo (born 1964), economist and engineer
- Charles Frederick Hartt (1840–1878), Canadian-American geologist and paleontologist
- Hermann von Ihering (1850–1930), German naturalist
- Fritz Köberle (1910–1983), Austrian physician and pathologist
- Grigori Ivanovitch Langsdorff (1774–1852), German/Russian naturalist
- Claude Lévi-Strauss (1908–2009), French anthropologist
- Emmanuel Liais (1826–1900), French astronomer and naturalist
- Lucien Lison (1908–1984), Belgian anatomist
- Fritz Müller (1821–1897), German naturalist
- Giuseppe Occhialini (1907–1993), Italian physicist
- Ludwig Riedel (1790–1861), German botanist
- Oscar Sala (1922–2010), Italian nuclear physicist
- Carl August Wilhelm Schwacke (1848–1904), German botanist
- Friedrich Sellow (1789–1831), German botanist
- Helmut Sick (1910–1991), German zoologist
- Peter Szatmari (born 1950), Hungarian geologist
- Gleb Wataghin (1899–1986), Russian/Italian physicist
- Stefan Zweig (1881–1942), Austrian novelist, playwright, journalist and biographer

== See also ==
- Brazilian expatriate academics
- List of Brazilian mathematicians
- National Order of Scientific Merit
- List of Brazilian intellectuals and thinkers
