= Guilherme Dable =

Brazilian artist (born 1976)

Guilherme Dable (born 1976, in Porto Alegre, Brazil) is a Brazilian artist who lives and works in Porto Alegre. He had his MFA from Universidade Federal do Rio Grande do Sul Art Institute in 2012, having graduated there in drawing in 2009. Guilherme Dable’s films The Tamer and The radio was always on in the kitchen are part of Museum of Modern Art, Rio de Janeiro’s permanent collection, 2016. Guilherme also has paintings in the above-mentioned collection on permanent loan from Gilberto Chateaubriand.

== Exhibitions ==
Selected Solo Exhibitions

2016 The radio was always on in the kitchen, Belmacz, London

2015 One enormous drawing, UFCSPA University Art Gallery, Porto Alegre

2014 The useless things are of great importance, Gestual Gallery, Porto Alegre

2014 The News, Visual Arts Institute, Porto Alegre

2014 This place between noon and two in the afternoon, Roberto Alban Gallery, Salvador

2013 Latentes - Sala Recife, Recife

2013 Alibis, detours and Freudian slips, Eduardo Fernandes Gallery, São Paulol

2013 That visited me in the time of images - Coleção de Arte Gallery, Rio de Janeiro

2012 White Board Project, StudioClio Arts and Humanities Institute, Porto Alegre

2012 Drawing in the works - Casa Paralela, Pelotas

2009 Some drawings, Gestual Gallery, Porto Alegre

Select Group Exhibitions

2015 Fictions, curated by Daniela Name - Caixa Cultural, Rio de Janeiro

Ficções catalog

2015 Trajectories in Process III, curated by Guilherme Bueno, Anita Schwartz Gallery, Rio de Janeiro

2015 Occupy Lucas, 21, curated by Gabriela Motta, Gestual Gallery, Porto Alegre

2014 Repentista #1, curated by Cyril Moumen, Gallery Nosco, London

2014 Bar for the Future, curated by Julia Muggenburg, Belmacz Gallery, London

2014 Secret Garden, curated by Sylvia Kim, NARS Foundation, New York

2014 Constructive Vouptuousness: pleasure and order on works on paper at the collection - curated by Eduardo Veras, Museum of Contemporary Art, Porto Alegre

2014 New Acquisitions Marcantonio Vilaça Award - curated by Luiz Camillo Osório, Museum of Modern Art, Rio de Janeiro

2013 Narrative Situations, curated by Marcus Lontra - Coleção de Arte Gallery, Rio de Janeiro, curated by Marcus Lontra

2013 Observatory, curated by Daniela Name - MUV Galeria - Rio de Janeiro

2013 Enter, curated by Ana Zavadil - Museum of Contemporary Art, Porto Alegre

2012 Travelling invitation, chief curator Agnaldo Farias Rumos, Visual Arts – Itaú Cultural, São Paulo

New Acquisitions 2010-2012 Gilberto Chateaubriand Collection, curated by Luiz Camillo Osório and Marta Mestre - Museum of Modern Art, Rio de Janeiro

2012 Instances of Drawing, curated by Atelier Subterrânea, Parque Lage School of Visual Arts, Rio de Janeiro

2012 Alien: manifestations of the shapeless, curated by José Francisco Alves - RS Museum of Art

2012 New Acquisitions Pinacoteca Aldo Locatelli - City Hall Art Gallery, Porto Alegre

2011 Object: Sound – ECARTA Foundation, Porto Alegre, curated by Leo Felipe

2011 [un]balances and [im]perfections, Coleção de Arte Gallery, Rio de Janeiro, curated by Marcus Lontra

2011 Maisimerso, organized by Flávio Gonçalves – ESPM Gallery, Porto Alegre

2010 Silences and Whispers - Vera Chaves Barcellos Foundation, Viamão, curated by Vera Chaves Barcellos

2010 Shared Spaces, organized by Guilherme Dable, Túlio Pinto and Gerson Reichert, Gestual Gallery, Porto Alegre

2010 19th Porto Alegre City Chamber Art Prize, City Chamber Gallery, Porto Alegre

Residencies and Awards

2015 Guilherme had a residency in Vermont Studio Center - Johnson, Vermont [partial fellowship]

2012 Group show “Maisimerso”: “Outstanding: Drawing” category award, Visual Arts Açorianos Prize, Porto Alegre

2010 Atelier Subterrânea: “Outstanding Institutional Work” category award - Porto Alegre

19th Porto Alegre City Chamber Art Prize - Acquisition Prize

2008 Atelier Subterrânea: “Alternative production project” category award - Visual Arts Açorianos Prize, Porto Alegre Department of Culture

2007 Shortlisted as Outstanding Work at Iberê Camargo Fellowship, Iberê Camargo Foundation, Porto Alegre

Collections

2015 Luiz Sacilotto Art Prize - work acquired for Santo André city collection

2013 Marcantonio Vilaça Award/FUNARTE - work acquired by the Museum of Modern Art, Rio de Janeiro

Gilberto Chateaubriand Collection/Museum of Modern Art, Rio de Janeiro

Museum of Modern Art, Rio de Janeiro

Vera Chaves Barcellos Foundation

Porto Alegre City Chamber Collection

Porto Alegre City Hall Collection

Rio Grande do Sul Museum of Contemporary Art

Rio Grande do Sul Museum of Art

Publications

MAUS, Lilian (org.) Subterrânea. Editora Panorama Crítico, 2009.

RIVITTI, Thaís. Espaços Independentes. Funarte: Conexão Artes Visuais, 2010.

BARCELLOS, Vera. Pomares Magazine. Fundação Vera Chaves Barcellos, 2010.

REZENDE, Renato. Coletivos. Editora Circuito, 2010.

KERN, Daniela. Tradição em Paralaxe. EdJuc, 2013.

VERBEKE, Johan. Conference Proceedings: Knowing (by) Designing. Sint-Lucas University, 2013.

ZAVADIL, Ana. Entre: Curadoria A-Z. Fumproarte, 2013.

FARIAS, Agnaldo, et al. Rumos: Convite à Viagem. Itaú Cultural, 2014.

FIDELIS, Gaudêncio. Alien: Manifestações do Disforme. MARGS, 2014.

WAQUIL, Isabel. Subterrânea Notas Entrópicas. Pubblicato, 2015.

Um ceu imenso, Jornal do Comercio, Pubblicato, 2015

Coisas para fazer nester terca-feira, ZH Entretenimento, Pubblicato, 2015
