= NGC 1356 =

Galaxy in the constellation Horologium

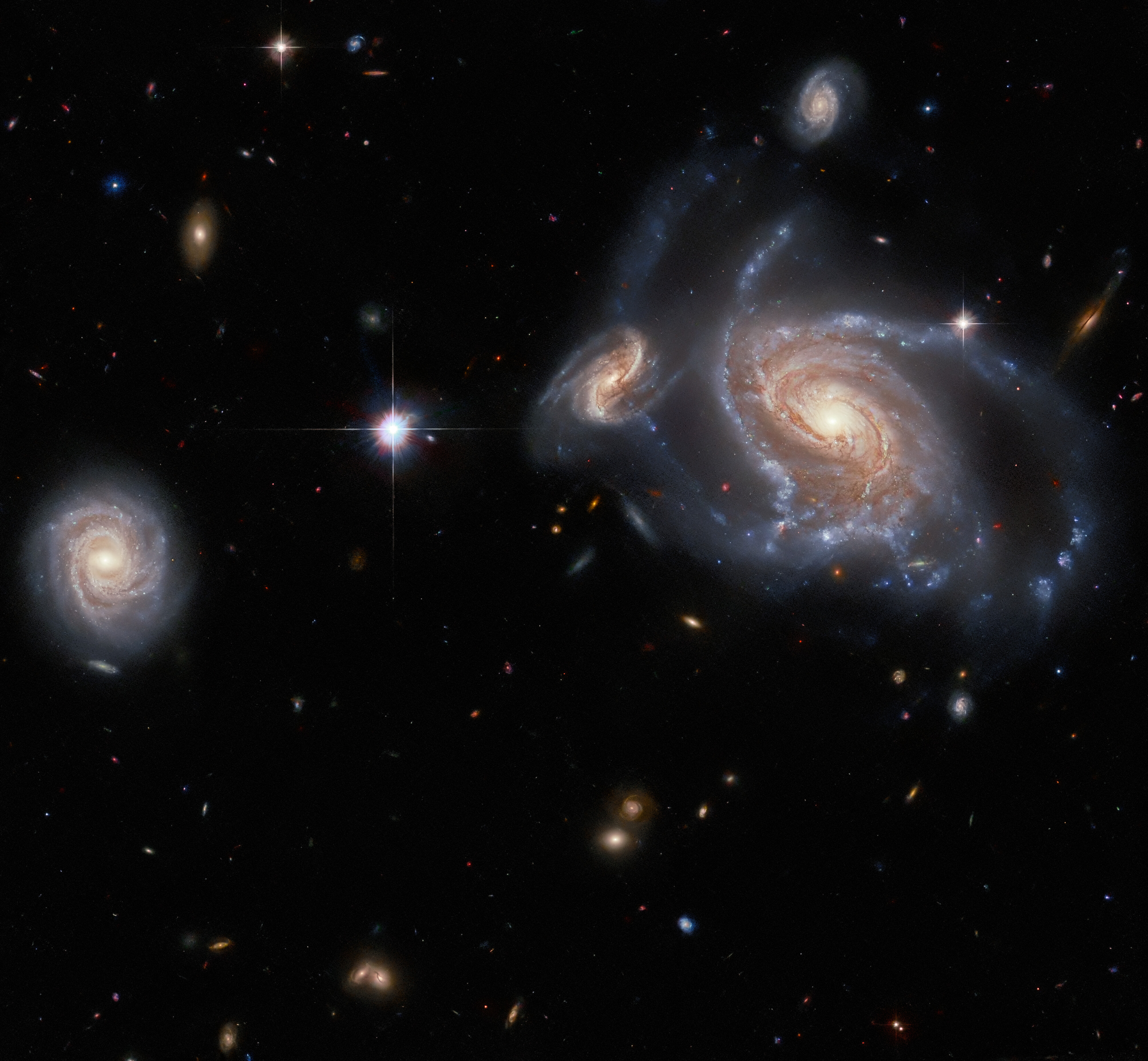
- HST image of NGC 1356

Observation data (J2000 epoch)
- Constellation: Horologium
- Right ascension: 03^{h} 30^{m} 40.8^{s}
- Declination: −50° 18′ 35″
- Redshift: 0.03934±5
- Heliocentric radial velocity: 11793±15km/s
- Distance: 550 Mly (170 Mpc)
- Apparent magnitude (B): 14.05

Characteristics
- Type: SAB(r)bc
- Size: ~350,000 ly (107.03 kpc) (estimated)
- Apparent size (V): 1.25 arcmin

Other designations
- AMC 0329-502, PGC 13035, IRAS 03291-5028, ESO 200-IG 031

NGC 1356 is a barred spiral galaxy located in the southern constellation of Horologium. It was discovered by English astronomer John Herschel on Dec 23, 1837.

At a distance of 550 million light-years (170 Mpc) away from the Sun, NGC 1356 is superimposed over an much more distant galaxy (also a barred spiral), PGC 95415, which is approximately 300 million light-years (93 Mpc) more distant than NGC 1356. The small galaxy seen to the far left of the Hubble Space Telescope (HST) image, IC 1947, is actually closer to NGC 1356.

The apparent pairing between NGC 1356 and PGC 95415 caused them to be included in the AMC catalog of peculiar galaxies (AMC 0329-502). Their true separation was determined later. Apparent galaxy pairs such as this one were used as a baseline for comparison to truly interacting galaxy pairs in a 1994-1996 spectroscopic study by Donzelli and Pastoriza using the Complejo Astronomicomico El Leoncito (CASLEO), San Juan, Argentina.
