= Ludmila Bourchtein =

Soviet and Brazilian mathematician

Ludmila Bourchtein (also transliterated as Lioudmila Bourchtein) is a Soviet and Brazilian mathematician and textbook author, a professor emerita at the Federal University of Pelotas in Brazil. Her research concerns mathematical analysis and conformal mapping.

== Education and career ==
Bourchtein received a bachelor's degree in mathematics from the Far Eastern Federal University in Vladivostok in 1960, and continued to work at Far Eastern Federal University for 34 years as an assistant, associate, and full professor. Meanwhile, she earned a doctorate through Saint Petersburg State University in 1968, with a dissertation on the solution of functional equations for complex analytic functions on the unit circle.

She joined the Federal University of Pelotas in Brazil in 1997, as an associate professor and later as a full professor, retired in 2010 and was named a professor emerita in 2019. At the Federal University of Pelotas, one of her students was Adriana Neumann de Oliveira, who credits Bourchtein as being her first female role model in mathematics.

== Books ==
With Andrei Bourchtein (her son), Ludmila Bourchtein is the coauthor of books, including:

- CounterExamples: From Elementary Calculus to the Beginnings of Analysis (CRC Press, 2015)
- Counterexamples on Uniform Convergence: Sequences, Series, Functions, and Integrals (Wiley, 2017)
- Complex Analysis (Springer, 2021)
- Theory of Infinite Sequences and Series (Springer, 2022)
- Elementary Functions (Birkhäuser, 2023)
- Ordinary Differential Equations: Exercises and Problems (College Publications, 2024)
