= Institute of Linguistics =

Institute of Linguistics may refer to:

== In Russia ==
- Institute of Linguistics of the Russian Academy of Sciences, a research institute in Moscow, Russia
- Institute for Linguistic Studies, a research institution in Saint Petersburg, Russia
- Institute of Linguistics of the Russian State University for the Humanities, a university in Moscow, Russia
  - Moscow School of Comparative Linguistics, a school of linguistics based in Moscow, Russia

== In Ukraine ==
- Kyiv International University, previously known as the International Institute of Linguistics and Law, a private university in Kyiv, Ukraine
- Potebnia Institute of Linguistics, a research institute in Kyiv, Ukraine

== In other countries ==
- Albania: Institute of Linguistics and Literature of the Academy of Albanological Studies
- Azerbaijan: Nasimi Institute of Linguistics
- Brazil: Instituto de Letras
- China: Institute of Linguistics of the Chinese Academy of Social Sciences
- Ghana: Ghana Institute of Linguistics, Literacy and Bible Translation
- Romania: "Iorgu Iordan – Alexandru Rosetti" Institute of Linguistics
- Taiwan: Institute of Linguistics of the Academia Sinica
- United Kingdom: Chartered Institute of Linguists

== International ==
- Instituto Lingüístico de Verano (Mexico), a non-profit organization incorporated in Mexico
- SIL Global, also known as Summer Institute of Linguistics, an evangelical Christian non-profit organization
