= José de Jesus Peixoto Camargo =

Brazilian surgeon (born 1946)

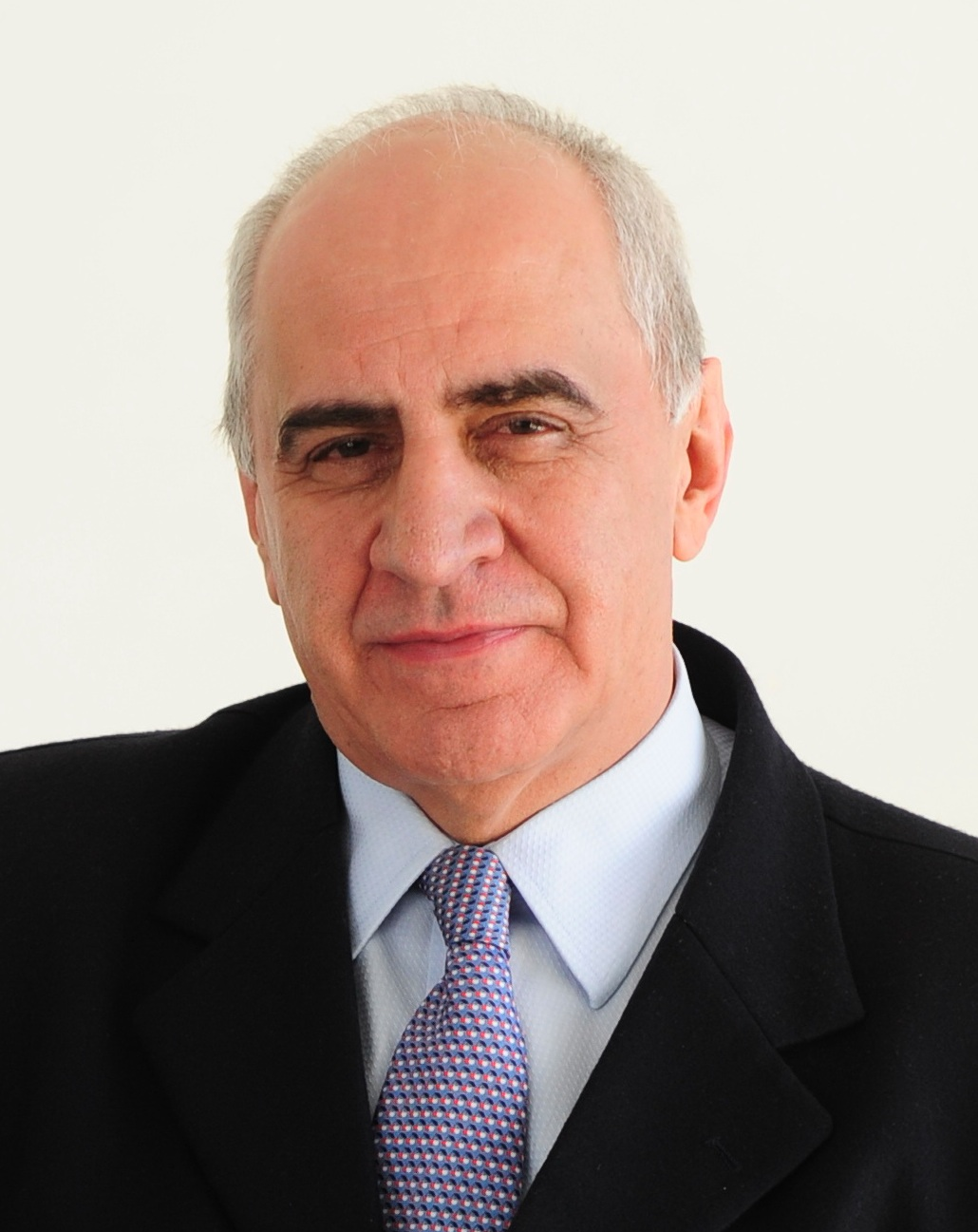

Personal details
- Born: August 6, 1946 (age 80) Vacaria, Brazil
- Education: Federal University of Rio Grande do Sul

José de Jesus Peixoto Camargo (born 6 August 1946), commonly known as J. J. Camargo, is a Brazilian thoracic surgeon, writer, and lecturer.

== Education and career ==
José de Jesus Peixoto Camargo was born on 6 August 1946 in Vacaria, in the southern Brazilian state of Rio Grande do Sul.

After graduating from the Federal University of Rio Grande do Sul in 1970, Camargo remained at the institution and earned a master's degree in Pulmonology Sciences in 1976, completing a thesis titled "Transvenous Biopsy in Advanced Bronchial Cancer." Following his residency, he joined the university as a physician and researcher, and was briefly appointed head of the department of surgery. In 1979, he presented his work on transplantation medicine—having performed more than 60 lung transplants and reimplantation surgeries in dogs—at the Pan-American Congress in Rio de Janeiro. His research attracted the attention of American physicians, who later invited him to undertake academic training in thoracic surgery at the Mayo Clinic in the United States.

As of 2022, he served as a professor at the Federal University of Health Sciences of Porto Alegre.

Camargo and his surgical team performed what is considered the first lung transplantation in Brazil and Latin America in 1989 and the first double lung transplant in Brazil. His team has been reported to hold the record for the most lung transplants in the country. In 2015, 60 per cent of all lung transplants performed in Brazil were attributed to them. He has also performed approximately 300 lung transplants and over 30,000 thoracic surgeries at Santa Casa.

Camargo created and currently directs "Transplantes da Santa Casa de Porto Alegre" (Transplant Center at Santa Casa de Porto Alegre). He is also the Director of "Cirurgia Torácica no Pavilhão Pereira Filho" (Thoracic Surgery at Pavilhão Pereira Filho).

He has served as a member of the Academia Sul-Riograndense de Medicina since 1993, and as a member of the National Academy of Medicine since 2010.

He has hundreds of scientific publications and has given approximately 900 lectures in 22 countries.

== Books ==
- Camargo, José J. (2000). Cirurgia torácica: mais de 120 questões de múltipla escolha com respostas comentadas (in Brazilian Portuguese). Rio de Janeiro: Revinter. p. 146. ISBN 8573093854.
- Garcia, Eduardo; Camargo, José J., eds. (2003). Histórias médicas (in Brazilian Portuguese). Porto Alegre: Ed. da ISCMPA. p. 149. ISBN 8589782034.
- Camargo, José J. (2008). Não pensem por mim: reflexões e histórias de um médico (in Brazilian Portuguese). Porto Alegre: AGE. p. 213. ISBN 9788574974118.
