= Fernanda Staniscuaski =

Brazilian biologist

- Born: January 5, 1981 (age 45); Erechim, Rio Grande do Sul, Brazil
- Education: Universidade Federal do Rio Grande do Sul
- Known for: Founder and coordinator of the Parent in Science movement
- Scientific career
- Fields: Biological Sciences, Biochemistry, Molecular biology, Women in STEM
- Workplaces: Universidade Federal do Rio Grande do Sul
- Thesis: Ureases de Canavalia ensiformis: processamento e mecanismo de ação em insetos

Fernanda Staniscuaski (5 January 1981) is a Brazilian biologist, with a PhD on molecular biology and biotechnology. Staniscuaski currently holds an associate professor position at the Universidade Federal do Rio Grande do Sul. She founded the Parent in Science Movement, aimed at supporting researchers in the challenging conciliation of motherhood and academia, as well as promoting public policies to increase the participation and retention of women in STEM.

== Education ==
Bachelor in Science from Universidade Federal do Rio Grande do Sul in 2002. PhD in Cellular and Molecular Biology from Universidade Federal do Rio Grande do Sul in 2007 and postdoctoral training at the University of Toronto in 2008–2009.

== Research and career ==
Staniscuaski has experience in Biochemistry and Molecular Biology. She is an associate professor of molecular biology at the Federal University of Rio Grande do Sul.

=== Parent in Science ===
The Parent in Science movement was founded in 2016 by Staniscuaski as an organization of Brazilian scientists with the objective of expanding the discussion on the challenges and consequences of combining motherhood and career as a scientist in Brazil. Staniscuaski is also one of the leaders of the #maternidadenoLattes movement, a project of Parent in Science, that gained momentum in the social networks and in the mainstream media in 2018. Also, she led the organization of the I Brazilian Symposium on Maternity & Science through the Parent in Science Movement, which discussed the challenges of being a mother in the Brazilian academy, and her testimony was featured at The Brazilian Congress of Medical Physics and the 50th anniversary of ABFM.

As part of her work with the Parent in Science Movement, Staniscuaski and colleagues published a letter in Science in May 2020 about the urgent need to postpone deadlines and create granting programs that take family needs into account on the impact of the coronavirus pandemic on academic mothers.

== Selected publications ==
- F. Mulinari, F. Stanisçuaski, L.R. Bertholdo-Vargas, M. Postal, O.B. Oliveira-Neto, D.J. Rigden, M.F. Grossi-de-Sá, C.R. Carlini. (2007). Jaburetox-2Ec: An insecticidal peptide derived from an isoform of urease from the plant Canavalia ensiformis. Peptides. 28(10): 2042–2050. Cited 79 times by Google Scholar as of April 6, 2021
- F. Stanisçuaski, C.T. Ferreira-DaSilva, F. Mulinari, M. Pires-Alves, C.R. Carlini. (2005). Insecticidal effects of canatoxin on the cotton stainer bug Dysdercus peruvianus (Hemiptera: Pyrrhocoridae). Toxicon. 45(6): 753–760. Cited 79 times by Google Scholar as of April 6, 2021
- F. Staniscuaski, F. Reichert, F.P. Werneck, L. de Oliveira, P.B. Mello-Carpes, R.C. Soletti, et al. Impact of COVID-19 on academic mothers. (2020). Science. 6492(368): 724-724. Cited 57 times accordingto Google Scholar, as of April 6, 2021
