= SDSS J1240+6710 =

White dwarf star in the constellation Draco

Observation data Epoch J2000.0 Equinox ICRS
- Constellation: Draco
- Right ascension: 12^{h} 40^{m} 43.456^{s}
- Declination: +67° 10′ 35.93″
- Apparent magnitude (V): 18.21

Characteristics
- Evolutionary stage: white dwarf
- Spectral type: DQ

Astrometry
Proper motion (μ)	RA: −184.774 mas/yr Dec.: −96.051 mas/yr
Parallax (π)	2.3600±0.1190 mas
Distance	1,380 ± 70 ly (420 ± 20 pc)

Details
Mass	0.56 M_{☉}

Other designations
- Dox, SDSS J124043.01+671034.68, SDSS J1240+6710

Database references
SIMBAD	data

SDSS J1240+6710 or SDSS J124043.01+671034.68, nicknamed Dox by its discoverers, is a white dwarf in the constellation Draco. It was discovered by Kepler de Souza Oliveira, Detlev Koester and Gustavo Ourique. It is unusual for having an atmosphere of almost pure oxygen. The atmosphere also has a detectable amount of magnesium, neon (under 4%) and silicon, but no hydrogen, helium or carbon. A possible explanation for the unusual composition would be if its mass were close to the limit for collapsing to a neutron star. However, its mass is only 0.56 solar masses, below the mass expected for a star that could convert carbon to oxygen, neon and magnesium.

The star was originally catalogued in the catalogue of new white dwarf stars from the Data Release 12 of the Sloan Digital Sky Survey. Gustavo Ourique, an undergraduate in Physics at Universidade Federal do Rio Grande do Sul, identified the star's unique spectrum, working under the advice of Dr. Kepler Oliveira (S.O. Kepler). The star's spectrum was modeled by Dr. Detlev Koester, characterizing its composition, temperature and mass.

In 2020, the star was discovered to be moving at an unusually high velocity. There is no fully-confirmed explanation for this. There are various theories put forth as to possible reasons for this. Some researchers indicate this may be due to a supernova that has not been observed yet, and which would cause this star to move at high velocities.

However, there is no definitive data that can absolutely prove that this is what happened. Astronomers note that some supernovas are difficult to detect, especially if they do not contain the element nickel, which is a key indicator for such events.
