= José Mauro Volkmer de Castilho =

Brazilian AI researcher (1946–1998)

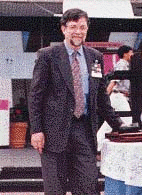
Professor Castilho

José Mauro Volkmer de Castilho (1946–1998) was a Brazilian scientist, teacher and researcher.

== Background ==
Castilho began his academic life at the Federal University of Rio Grande do Sul where he studied engineering. After graduation, in 1971, he went to Rio de Janeiro where he obtained his master's degree in 1973 and Phd in 1982 both on PUC Rio University. José Mauro died of cancer in 1998, he was married and father of three children.

== Scientific activity ==
In his honor, since 1998, Brazilian Computer Society sponsors the Jose Mauro de Castilho Award which is given to the best paper as selected by the program committee.
