= Miriani Griselda Pastoriza =

Argentine astronomer (*1939)

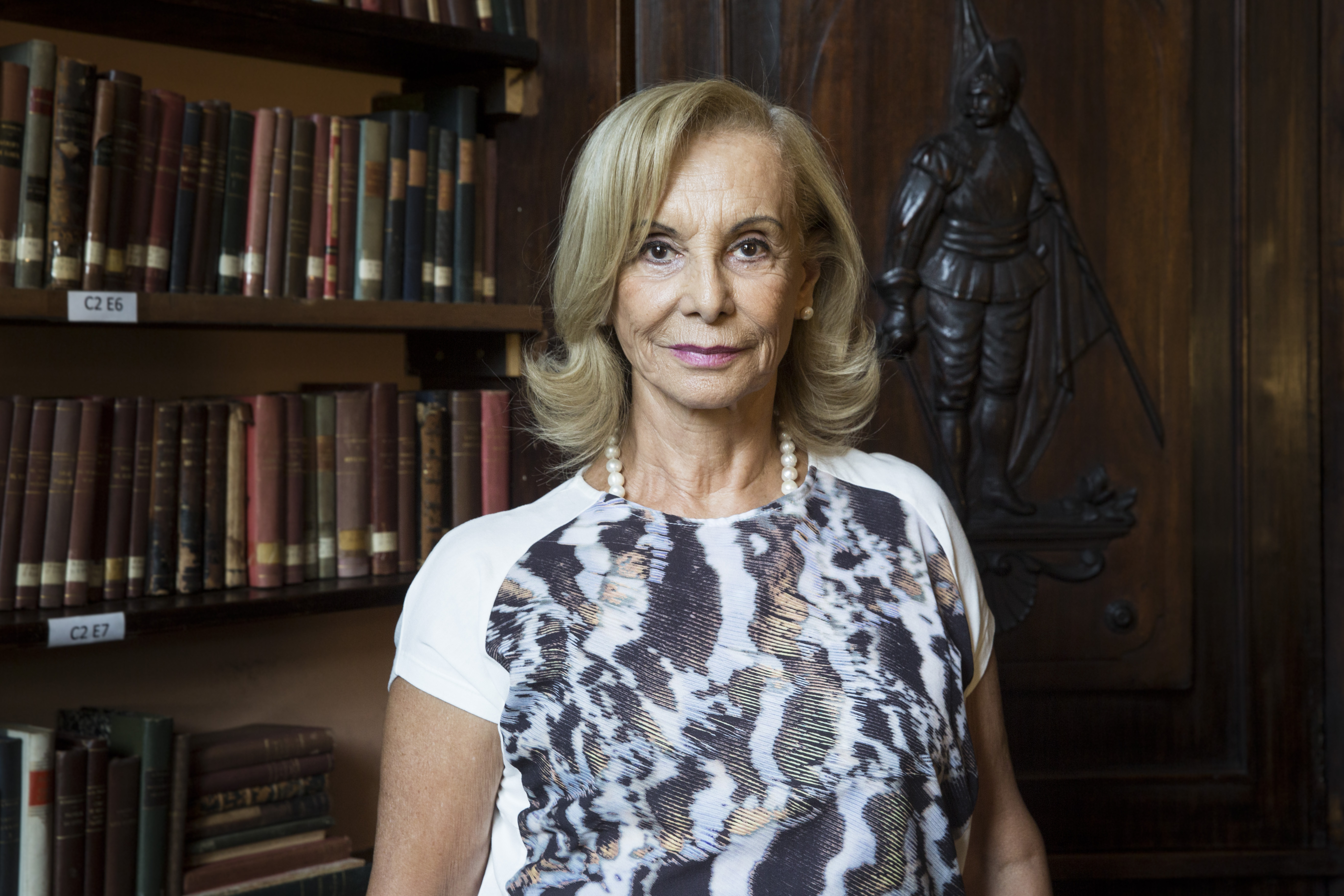
Miriani Pastoriza

Miriani Griselda Pastoriza (born 1939) is an Argentine-born Brazilian astronomer, tenured professor in the Department of Astronomy of the Institute of Physics, at the Federal University of Rio Grande do Sul, and is a member of the Brazilian Academy of Sciences.

== Biography ==
Miriani Griselda Pastoriza was born in 1939, in Villa San Martín Loreto, Santiago del Estero Province, Argentina. One of her main scientific contributions was the discovery and characterization, together with the Argentine astronomer José Luis Sérsic, of the so-called Sersic-Pastoriza galaxies (also known as galaxies with peculiar nuclei).

In 1970, she personally determined that the spectrum of the galaxy NGC 1566 is variable, which was a shocking discovery that introduced a change in the discipline. Continuing with this line of research, Pastoriza, in collaboration with international researchers, carried out work on light variability in other galaxies, which allowed mapping of the structure and size of the central regions of galaxies where supermassive black holes are hosted.

Pastoriza was the scientific advisor for many Brazilian astronomers who are now leading international scientists, including Thaisa Storchi Bergmann and Eduardo Luiz Damiani Bica.

Pastoriza is also an active fighter for female equality in science. She collaborates with the Latin American Association of Women Astronomers. She also participates in a program in Brazil called "Girls in Science".

Pastoriza is the representative of Brazil in the “International Scientific Committee of Gemini telescopes”. She also represents Brazil on the “SOAR Telescope International Board of Directors” and belongs to the “Board of Directors of the National Observatory of Rio de Janeiro”. She was appointed a member of the “Board of Directors of the National Astrophysics Laboratory of Sao Paulo”.

Since 2014, she has been an Emeritus Professor at the Federal University of Rio Grande do Sul.

Pastoriza is a naturalized Brazilian.

== Awards and honours ==
- In 1995 she was included in a list of the 170 most productive researchers in Brazil in all areas of science, published by Folha do Sao Paulo, one of the newspapers with the largest circulation in Brazil.
- She has reached the highest category for a researcher in Brazil, classified as 1A within the CNPq.
- She is the representative of Brazil in the International Scientific Committee of Gemini telescopes and SOAR Telescope International Board of Directors.
- She is part of the Board of Directors of the National Observatory of Rio de Janeiro and Board of Directors of the National Astrophysics Laboratory of Sao Paulo.
- The Brazilian Astronomical Society named an award after her to recognize outstanding contributions in astronomical research.
- In 2007, she was named a member of the Brazilian Academy of Sciences.
- In 2008, she was awarded the Medal of Commendation from the National Order of Scientific Merit of Brazil - one of the highest recognition to which a scientist in that country can aspire - for her relevant contributions to Science and Technology
- On October 24, 2018, the National University of Córdoba awarded her the title of Doctor Honoris Causa for her contributions to the field of astronomy.

== Legacy ==
The "Miriani Pastoriza Award" is named in her honor by the board of directors of the Brazilian Astronomical Society.
