= Jairton Dupont =

Brazilian chemist

Jairton Dupont (born 16 December 1958, in Farroupilha) is a Brazilian chemist whose research concerns ionic liquids, organometallic catalysis, and metallic nanoparticles. Currently, he is a professor at UFRGS.

== Early life and education ==
Dupont was born in Rio Grande do Sul, Brazil, into a family with economic difficulties, and at the age of 14, he was hired as a clerk in a hardware store. He completed his graduation in Chemistry at Pontifícia Universidade Católica do Rio Grande do Sul. Dupont earned his Ph.D. from the Louis Pasteur University, Strasbourg, in 1988.

== Career ==
Dupont conducted postdoctoral research at the Dyson Perrins Laboratory, before becoming professor of chemistry at UFRGS.

From 2014 to 2017, he was Professor of Sustainable Chemistry at the University of Nottingham. He is a member of the Brazilian Academy of Sciences and a recipient of Brazil's National Order of Scientific Merit and the TWAS Prize.
