= Patricia Pranke =

Brazilian stem cell researcher (born 1967)

Patricia Helena Lucas Pranke
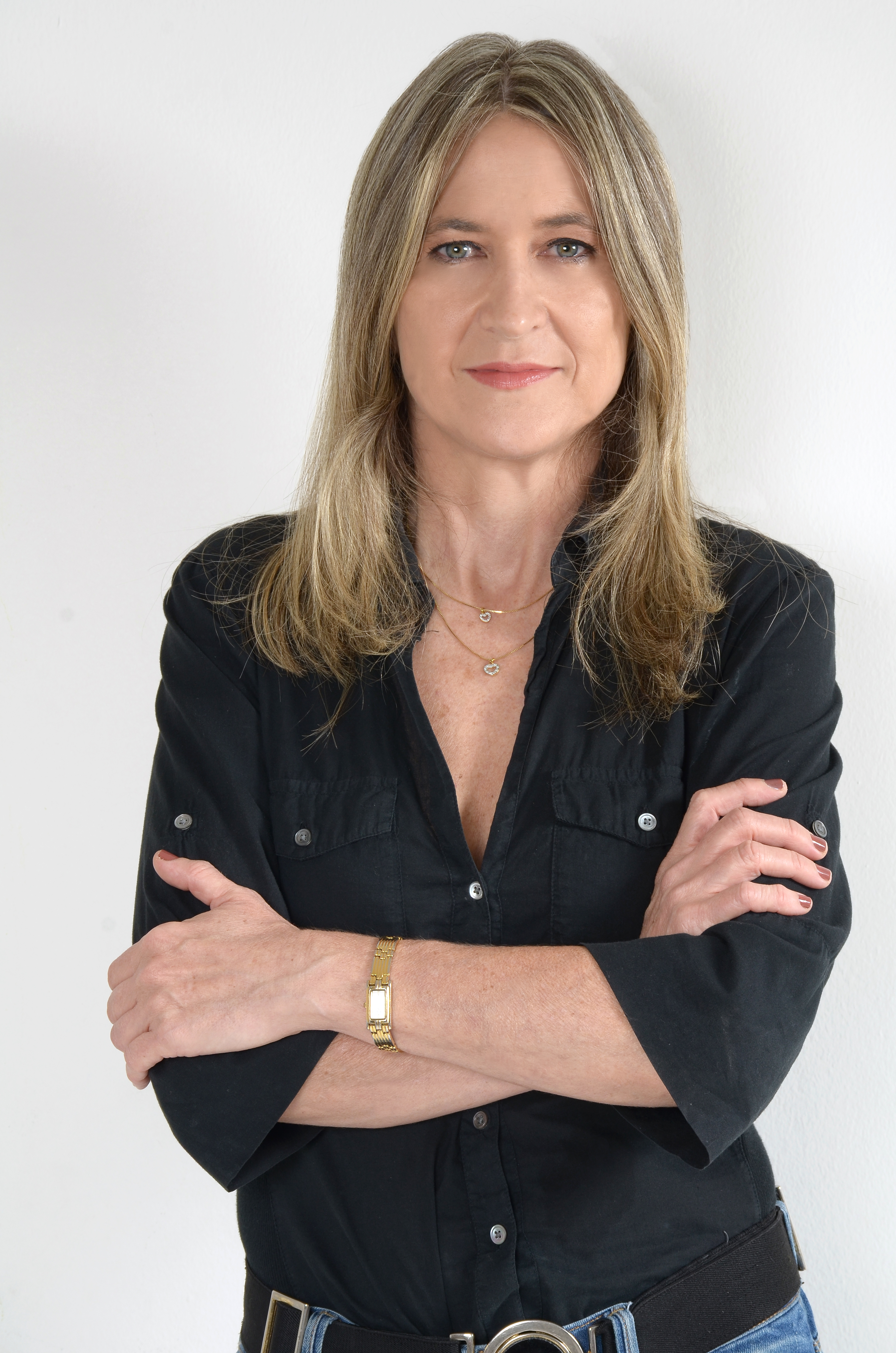
- Born: 1967 (age 58–59)
- Education: Federal University of Santa Maria, State University of Campinas, Federal University of Rio Grande do Sul, Philipps-Universität Marburg
- Occupation: Stem cell researcher

Patricia Helena Lucas Pranke is a Brazilian stem cell researcher at the Federal University of Rio Grande do Sul. Between 2003 and 2005, Pranke was one of two scientists who helped the Federal Government of Brazil write the National Biosafety Law, regulating research on human embryonic stem cells in Brazil.

== Biography ==
Pranke earned a degree in Pharmacy and Biochemistry (1990) from the Federal University of Santa Maria (UFSM), completed a master's degree in Medical Sciences (1994) from the State University of Campinas (UNICAMP), a doctorate in Genetics and Molecular Biology (2002) from Federal University of Rio Grande do Sul (UFRGS) / New York Blood Center - United States - and a post-doctorate from Philipps-Universität Marburg, Germany, in the area of using nanotechnology techniques for tissue engineering through the cultivation of stem cells in nanofiber molds for the reconstitution of organs and tissues.

Specifically, she works in the area of hematology and stem cells on the following topics: stem cells, umbilical cord blood, nanotechnology, nanomedicine, regenerative medicine, tissue engineering and artificial organs.

Since 1995, she has worked as a professor and head of the Hematology and Stem Cell Laboratory at the Faculty of Pharmaceutical Sciences at UFRGS.

In Brazil, Pranke has been a pioneer in introducing the study of stem cells associated with nanotechnology for the Tissue Engineering and Regenerative Medicine International Society (TERMIS).

== Memberships ==
- She has served as a member of the TERMIS - AMERICA board since 2015 and president of the TERMIS - AMERICAS committee for Latin America.
- Member of the International Stem Cell Banking Initiative (ISCBI) group.
- Member of the council of TERMIS-AM (Tissue Engineering and Regenerative Medicine International Society-AMERICAS) (2015–2017).
- Member of the board of directors of SLABO (Latin American Society of Biomaterials, Artificial Organs and Tissue Engineering) (2015- 2017).
- Pranke was one of the two scientific advisors to the Brazilian Government concerning the formation of the law to approve the human embryonic stem cell research (2003–2005).

== Selected publications ==
Pranke has published more than 70 articles in scientific journals and 6 book chapters.

- DI Braghirolli, D Steffens, P Pranke, "Electrospinning for regenerative medicine: a review of the main topics," Drug discovery today 19 (6), (2014): 743–753.
- P Andrews, D Baker, N Benvinisty, B Miranda, K Bruce, O Brüstle, M Choi, ..., "Points to consider in the development of seed stocks of pluripotent stem cells for clinical applications," International Stem Cell Banking Initiative (ISCBI), Regenerative medicine 10 (2s), (2015):1
- L Bernardi, SB Luisi, R Fernandes, TP Dalberto, L Valentim, JAB Chies, ..., "The isolation of stem cells from human deciduous teeth pulp is related to the physiological process of resorption," Journal of endodontics 37 (7), (2011):973-979
- MG de Morais, C Stillings, R Dersch, M Rudisile, P Pranke, JAV Costa, ..., "Preparation of nanofibers containing the microalga Spirulina (Arthrospira)," Bioresource technology, 101 (8), (2010): 2872–2876
- MG Morais, VG Martins, D Steffens, P Pranke, JAV da Costa, "Biological applications of nanobiotechnology," Journal of nanoscience and nanotechnology 14 (1), (2014):1007-1017
- D Steffens, D Leonardi, PR da Luz Soster, M Lersch, A Rosa, T Crestani, ..., "Development of a new nanofiber scaffold for use with stem cells in a third degree burn animal model." Burns 40 (8), (2014): 1650–1660
- D Lindemann, SB Werle, D Steffens, F Garcia-Godoy, P Pranke, ..., Effects of cryopreservation on the characteristics of dental pulp stem cells of intact deciduous teeth, Archives of oral biology 59 (9), (2014): 970–976
- D Steffens, M Lersch, A Rosa, C Scher, T Crestani, MG Morais, JAV Costa, ..., "A New Biomaterial of Nanofibers with the Microalga Spirulinaas Scaffolds to Cultivate with Stem Cells for Use in Tissue Engineering," Journal of biomedical nanotechnology 9 (4), (2013): 710–718
- STO Saad, FF Costa, V Tereza, SI Salles, PHL Pranke, "Red cell membrane protein abnormalities in hereditary spherocytosis in Brazil." British journal of haematology 88 (2), (1994): 295–299
