= Kepler de Souza Oliveira =

Brazilian astrophysicist

Kepler de Souza Oliveira Filho (born 16 February 1956), also known as S. O. Kepler, is a Brazilian astronomer primarily known for his work on white dwarfs, variable stars, and magnetars. A member of the Brazilian Academy of Sciences, he is currently a professor at Universidade Federal do Rio Grande do Sul (UFRGS).

== Biography ==
Born in Salvador, Bahia, Brazil, Kepler obtained his Ph.D. from the University of Texas at Austin in 1984. In January 2006, Oliveira and researchers at the University of Texas identified a pulsating white dwarf star, G117-B15A, as the most stable known optical clock, more stable than an atomic clock. The team's findings were published in The Astrophysical Journal.

He was president of the Sociedade Brasileira de Astronomia from 2002 to 2004, and is its current vice-president (2014–2016). He served on the SOAR and Gemini Board for the Association of Universities for Research in Astronomy, which is responsible for managing the Gemini Observatory. Together with Antonio Nemmer Kanaan Neto and other researchers, he is the co-discoverer of BPM37093, the "Diamond Star", a crystallized carbon-oxygen core pulsating white dwarf. With Detlev Koester and Gustavo Ourique, he discovered SDSSJ1240+6710, an oxygen white dwarf, "Dox".

Together with Maria de Fátima Oliveira Saraiva, he is the author of the book and site Astronomia e Astrofísica.
