= Julia Muggenburg =

German artist and jeweller

- Born: 1970 (age 55–56)
- Citizenship: Germany
- Occupations: artist and jeweler
- Years active: 1990-present

Julia Muggenburg (born 1970) is a German artist and jeweler based in London. She is the founder of Belmacz, a contemporary art gallery in Mayfair, London, established in 2000.

== Biography and work ==
Muggenburg was born in Mettmann, Germany, and grew up in Wuppertal and Düsseldorf. She moved to the United Kingdom in 1991. She completed a postgraduate course in Ancient and Medieval Arts at Christie's and later an Advanced Diploma in Painting at Central Saint Martins.

In the mid-1990s, she began creating jewelry and in 2000 went on to found Belmacz.

In October 2014, Muggenburg exhibited the collection Fourth Drawer Down on the intersection between art, anthropology and British history. In 2016, she curated InterKontinental, an exhibition that featured the work of 17 artists from ten countries.

In 2018, Belmacz presented If I Was Your Girlfriend: A Jam, an exhibition celebrating the life of Prince with a playlist by Jarvis Cocker and publication by Lina Viste Grønli. In 2021, Belmacz presented A Case of Med(dling)tation, a performative work by Sadie Murdoch and Abbas Zahedi as part of London’s inaugural Performance Exchange. In 2022, one of the gallery's artists, Jakob Lena Knebl, represented Austria at the 59th Venice Biennale with her partner Ashley Hans Scheirl.

Muggenburg's work has been reviewed by several media publications. She has been featured in Financial Times, Interview Magazine, Fad Magazine, The New York Times Magazine, Vogue US, Vogue UK, Vogue China, Vogue Russia and Vogue Italia, Nowness and AnOther.

== Selected group exhibitions ==
- 2023 - Women of the '20s
- 2023 - Flower in the Wind
- 2023 - Gernot Wieland: Halb Nackt
- 2023 - Toby Christian: no odonata
- 2022 - “Private” Parts!?: Jakob Lena Knebl & Ashley Hans Scheirl, with Duncan Grant
- 2022 - Agata Madejska: No Meat Without Bones
- 2021-22 - Beuys Open Source
- 2021 – I dialogue, Kinch, Belmacz
- 2021 – Abbas Zahedi: 11 & 1
- 2020 – Paul Housley: The Poets Elbow
- 2020 – Slow Painting, Leeds Art Gallery (featuring Paul Housley)
- 2020 – Johanna Magdalena Guggenberger: Hand it Over
- 2019 – Jakob Lena Knebl: I am he as you are he as you are me. And we are all together
- 2019 – Estagon
- 2018 – Trimini Rising with Stanislav Filko, Luisa Gardini and Magdalena Drwiega
- 2018 – If I Was Your Girlfriend: A Jam
- 2017 – Alpenglühen: 100 years of Ettore Sottsass Jr
- 2016 – InterKontinental
- 2016 – The Conformist
- 2013 – Love Letter curated in collaboration with Zoe Bedeaux
- 2013 – Miss G – The Private World of Greta Garbo
- 2013 – Women in Love
