= Marcia Barbosa =

Brazilian physicist

- Márcia Cristina Bernardes Barbosa
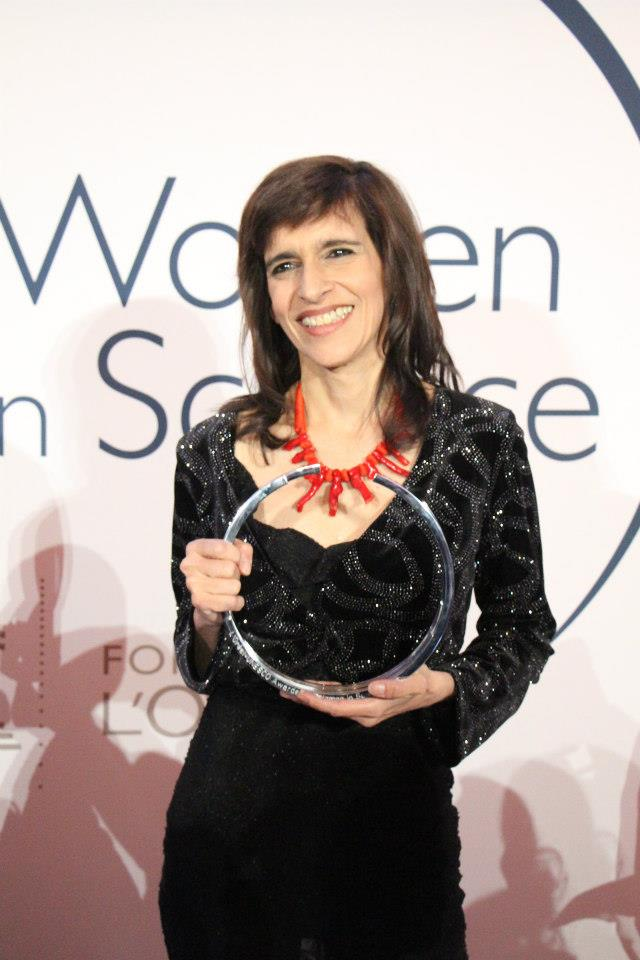
- Prof. Marcia Barbosa at the Sorbonne University in Paris, France (2013 L'Oréal-UNESCO For Women in Science Awards ceremony)
- Born: Rio de Janeiro, Brazil
- Education: Universidade Federal do Rio Grande do Sul
- Awards: Nicholson Medal (2009); L'Oréal-UNESCO Award (2013)
- Scientific career
- Fields: Hydrodynamics
- Workplaces: UFRGS Physics Institute
- Doctoral advisor: Walter K. Theumann
- Website: www.if.ufrgs.br/~barbosa/

Márcia Cristina Bernardes Barbosa (in international publications, Márcia is often spelled without the acute accent) is a Brazilian physicist known for her research on the properties of water, and for her efforts for improving the conditions for women in academia. She is a professor at UFRGS, and a director of the Brazilian Academy of Sciences. She is the rector of UFRGS.

== Biography ==
Born in Rio de Janeiro, Brazil, she did her high school studies at the Colégio Marechal Rondon, in Canoas, Rio Grande do Sul, Brazil, and her undergraduate and graduate studies at the Universidade Federal do Rio Grande do Sul (UFRGS), Porto Alegre, Brazil. After getting her PhD she spent two years as a postdoc at the research group of Michael Fisher at the University of Maryland. Back in Brazil she got a permanent position at the UFRGS where she works now, as Full Professor of Physics.

Marcia Cristina Barbosa is currently the director of the Brazilian Academy of Science and a professor at the Federal University of Rio Grande do Sul, a world-renowned university in Brazil. The doctor studies water and its anomalies. Her research contributes to the discipline by explaining how floating ice on liquid water (which is outside the standard of substances) is a consequence of the high specific heat of terrestrial life and the geometry of terrestrial water.

Dr. Barbosa was born in Rio de Janeiro, RJ and raised in Canoas, RS (Forbes, 2021). When I asked why she decided to become a scientist, Dr. Barbosa stated that it was because of “helping my father make repairs in the house (electricity and hydraulics) and working as a volunteer in the college laboratory”. She attended a public school in Brazil. It was there that at the invitation of the director of the school, Dr. Barbosa studied in the afternoon and worked at night to set up the laboratory (Santos, 2019).

In college, it came time to start her academic life in a discipline that is primarily composed of males and rampant with sexist ideologies. It was a challenge each and every day. Dr. Barbosa highlighted that at her university, “I was a stranger in the nest. I came from public school and I was always the only girl in the room. When difficulties appeared (and in physics, they always appear) because of how rigorous and challenging it is, I questioned myself. Is this for me?” (Barbosa, 2018).

In 1999, when Márcia and another scientist (the only two female scientists in a group of ninety-eight men) were part of the General Assembly of the International Union of Pure and Applied Physics (IUPAP), it was constituted the Women's Working Group in Physics. The group worked with the aim of obtaining data on the participation of women in Physics at different career levels in the world, identifying the barriers that represent an obstacle and defining actions to reverse the problem (IUPAP, n.d.)

== Research on water ==
Throughout her career, Barbosa has sought to unlock the secrets of water's anomalies, initially from a theoretical perspective and then by focusing her insights on practical applications for medicine and the life sciences.

Barbosa's work has helped explain why many characteristics of water – the motion of its molecules, its reaction to changes in temperature and pressure – make it different from other liquids in vast and important ways, and how biomolecules such as DNA, proteins and fats interact with water within the human body. She has furthermore developed a series of models about the properties of water that have contributed to our understanding of water's interactions with biological molecules and geological processes.

For her study of water anomalies, she won the Loreal-Unesco Prize for Women in Physical Sciences and the Claudia Prize in Science, both in 2013. In parallel, she works on gender issues, for which she won the Nicholson Medal of the American Physical Society in 2009. For her performance at the postgraduate level won the Anisio Teixeira Prize from Capes in 2016 and for her work in favor of science she received in 2018 from the presidency the Medal of Scientific Merit as Commander and, in 2021, the Silvio Torres Medal from Fapergs (Currículo Lattes,2022). Moreover, Dr. Barbosa is one of the 20 most powerful women in Brazil, according to a list by the national Forbes magazine 2020 (Forbes, 2021).

== Questions of gender ==
In 1998 she became involved with the gender issue in physics. She worked as chair of the International Union of Pure and Applied Physics Working Group on Women in Physics. This group organized a number of conferences on women in physics. In 2008 she became vice-president of the Union of Pure and Applied Physics and director of the Instituto de Física da UFRGS. For her activities on gender issues she was awarded with the 2009 Nicholson Medal given by the American Physical Society.

Years later, upon receiving the Unesco Prize, Dr. Barbosa stated “imagine how sad it would be to ban 50% of the population from such a wonderful feeling!” (Vasconcelos, 2019), referring to the female population who are not recognized in the scientific field. Following this, she was asked to join the Brazilian Academy of Science. “I was told that I was chosen because I wear short skirts” (Vasconcelos, 2019) mentioned Dr. Barbosa. For being a Latina woman from Brazil, her name does not appear easily when looking for innovations in the physics field. But as she said, her success is “not because of [my skirt], but because of my arguments” (Vasconcelos, 2019).

== Awards ==
2013 L'Oréal-UNESCO For Women in Science Awards Laureate for Latin America.

2009 Dwight Nicholson Medal for Outreach Recipient from the American Physical Society
