= Abbas Zahedi =

Artist

- Born: 1984 (age 41–42)
- Education: University College London; Royal College of Art
- Awards: Frieze Artist Award; Stanley Picker Fellowship
- Website: https://abbzah.com/

Abbas Zahedi (born 1984) is a London-based British–Iranian interdisciplinary artist.

Arsalan Isa has described Zahedi's work as a form of 'Dissociative Realism', which Zahedi defines as "moving between intimacy and estrangement, and attuned to forms of meaning that sit beyond the purely material". According to artist Othello De'Souza-Hartley, his work is both art and social practice.

Zahedi is an Associate Lecturer at the Royal College of Art in London and served as trustee of the South London Gallery from 2014 to 2021.

== Education ==
From 2002 to 2006, Zahedi studied for a BSc in Physiology and Pharmacology at University College London. In 2006, he began studying for an MBBS in Medicine also at the University College London, discontinuing in 2011 due to personal hardship.

After leaving his medical training early, Zahedi went on to study an MA in Contemporary Photography; Practices and Philosophies at Central Saint Martins (2017–19). There, he dedicated his thesis to the Grenfell Tower disaster in 2017, where he lost a good friend, photographer Khadija Saye. He presented a work titled Dwelling: In This Space We Grieve (2019), an empty fridge which emitted a green light, saying "I'm holding this space for Khadija, who should have been in this show with me. But she's not here."

== Work ==
Whilst Zahedi's work has usually taken the form of site-specific installations, interventions or exhibitions, as Chloe Carroll (Art Monthly) stated "'exhibition' feels like a misnomer since the artist rejects any impulse to display, preferring instead to draw attention to an already existing set of conditions."

From 2010 to 2017, Zahedi ran a philosophy symposium in his friend's fish and chip shop, the Grove Fish Bar in Ladbroke Grove.

In 2015, Zahedi founded BARBEDOUN, a community-based social-enterprise which ran until 2017. This took the form of a pop-up bar influenced by the British Temperance Movement.

In 2017, Zahedi took part in the Venice Biennale's Diaspora Pavilion, where he brewed a drink combining a traditional Iranian soft-drink mixed with an East-London craft beer.

In 2020, Zahedi made another drink-based work in the form of Soul Refresher (2020), a pink drink made in collaboration with Square Root Soda works, inspired by the Indian sherbet syrup Rooh Afza. This was distributed at various sites in the Borough of Brent in London, predominantly the Sufra Food Bank.

In 2020, Zahedi was commissioned a work by Art Fund (alongside Barby Asante, Adam Farah, Yasmin Nicolas and Dhelia Snoussi). The work was shown at the first Brent Biennial, which took place across different venues from 19 September - 13 December 2020, as part of the Brent's celebrations as 2020 London Borough of Culture.

In 2020, Zahedi exhibited at the South London Gallery's Fire Station as part of their 9th Postgraduate Artist in Residence programme, with work exploring grief and ritual/lamentation rites. This installation included sound work made in collaboration with Iranian musicians Saint Abdullah. The space also became a respite space for NHS workers during the winter.

In 2020, Zahedi hosted Ouranophobia SW3, an installation in a sorting office in Chelsea. The installation consisted of sculptural, sonic (including Islamic mourning prayers) and architectural elements that explored the history of the site. Originally open to the public, during the COVID-19 lockdowns it remained open as a place where frontline staff, particularly those from the Royal Brompton Hospital which was opposite the space, could seek respite from their work.

In 2020, Zahedi produced his first video work, We Don't Know where We Are in the Drama. Working with Arc Theatre's young women's group, Raised Voices, he facilitated dialogues with women on the Becontree Estate around the Dagenham idol, a Neolithic wooden figure. Woven into the film are images of artist Madelon Vriesendrop's figurines.

In 2022, as part of his winning of the Frieze Artist Award, Zahedi produced his commission Waiting With {Sonic Support}, a work that combined a waiting area with a public support space. There were two parts of the installation, one indoors at Frieze London and a larger structure outside in Regent's Park. The physical structures were modelled after Soviet-era Central Asian bus stops. The outdoor structure hosted an open-mic which was transmitted into the smaller indoor structure and into the shuttle cars (for VIPs) at Frieze.

Continuing to explore his interest in collective practices and rituals, Zahedi's 2022 exhibition 'Metatopia 10013' at Anonymous Gallery in New York, he explored questions of ritualistic practices of grieving.

In 2022, Zahedi ran a public programme at the Barbican Centre in response to an exhibition of Postwar artists drawing on contemporary anxieties that relate to social praxis, performance and moving-image.

Zahedi's work Holding a Heart in Artifice (2023) at Nottingham Contemporary also involved hosting an expansive public programme that included private visits for members of Glenfield Hospital's ECMO unit community and hospital staff, an open-mic, a dumpling party and a writer's crit on the theme of grief.

Zahedi has a long-term dialogue and collaboration with artist Joshua Leon, whom he first met at the Ministry of Sound, for the DRAF (David Roberts Art Foundation) 20th anniversary Party.

From 2025 to 2026, as part of Tate Modern's year-long group exhibition Gathering Ground, Zahedi has exhibited his sonic installation Begin Again, which "creates a space for the collective processing of ecological grief." In the installation, playback devices and instruments were plugged into the utility pipes and architectural infrastructure of the Tate Modern creating a composition that "shifts between moments of harmony and disintegration." Zahedi describes this process as "an immersive acoustic field — not a harmony in the traditional sense, but closer to a tuning process, as if the installation is continually trying to attune itself to its environment." As part of this work, Zahedi hosts a monthly 'support group' open to the public, offering a space to discuss ecological grief. He describes this a "not as a public-facing add-on, but as part of the material language of the exhibition", whereby each session picks up from the last, providing "time to build trust, to return, to begin again."

== Awards ==
Zahedi has been awarded Stanley Picker Fellowship (2024), Artangel: Making Time (2023), Frieze Artist Award (2022), Paul Hamlyn Foundation Award (2021), and the Khadijah Saye Memorial Scholarship (2017).

== Personal life ==
Zahedi grew up in West London, in the same housing estate as Grenfell Tower.

Both Zahedi's Iranian parents died whilst he was growing up, and his brother died in his early adulthood after a failed heart transplant.

Zahedi describes himself as a "migrant worker in London, born in France from Polish Catholic parents and having embraced Islam, I am a stranger in my own country and even in my own family. I realised that there is no place I can legitimately call home... except with the people with whom I share love and friendship." However, elsewhere it states he was born in London. Despite having grown up in a religious environment, Zahedi describes himself as a product of the contemporary condition where many feel that we have outgrown the need for metaphysics. Yet whilst he doesn't "practice within a religious tradition, and I don't claim a spiritual lineage in any orthodox sense...I come from a highly enchanted beginning, and I carry with me a strong sense of what, in Hegelian terms, might be called spirit."

Zahedi has said that he has lived through "years of instability, including periods of practical homelessness" and living between temporary accommodation, which has shaped his idea of art, not as something that one would display or collect, but something "more than an object — it had to be a site of relation, a holding space. A way to move through grief, transition, and uncertainty — and to connect across social and emotional thresholds that weren't otherwise being acknowledged." He describes making work as "a survival strategy. Something had to hold what wasn't being held elsewhere."
