= Adriana Neumann de Oliveira =

Brazilian mathematician (born 1980)

- Citizenship: Brasil
- Education: Universidade Federal do Rio Grande do Sul
- Scientific career
- Fields: interacting particle systems
- Thesis: Hydrodynamical Limit and Large Deviations Principle for the Exclusion Process with Slow Bonds
- Doctoral advisor: Cláudio Landim

Adriana Neumann de Oliveira (born 25 January 1980) is a Brazilian mathematician specializing in interacting particle systems, awarded by the L'Oréal-UNESCO Prizes for women in science in 2016. She is a professor in the Department of Pure and Applied Mathematics of the Federal University of Rio Grande do Sul.

Neumann earned her Ph.D. in 2011 at the Instituto Nacional de Matemática Pura e Aplicada. Her dissertation, Hydrodynamical Limit and Large Deviations Principle for the Exclusion Process with Slow Bonds, was supervised by Cláudio Landim.

She is an affiliate member of the Brazilian Academy of Sciences, elected in 2020.
