= Gilberto Righi =

Brazilian earthworm taxonomist (1937–1999)

Gilberto Righi (1937–1999) was an important earthworm taxonomist from São Paulo, Brazil, who helped define the magnitude of his country's diverse soil fauna.

During more than 40 highly productive years as professor and researcher at the University of São Paulo, Righi published over 100 scientific papers, 85 of which treat earthworm taxonomy, 5 treat earthworm physiology, 5 treat earthworm ecology, and 3 treat earthworm biogeography. Besides these, he issued 16 papers on microdrile oligochaetes and 17 on other invertebrate groups, mainly on crustaceans and molluscs. Most of Righi's taxonomic work was on Brazilian earthworms, but he also studied species from other Neotropical countries, including Peruvian earthworms. Righi was the author of one new family, 25 new genera, and 224 new species of earthworms, mostly from Brazil (Fragoso, Brown & Feijoo, 2003).

Righi's vast collection of earthworms, in over 1600 spirit containers, is deposited in the Oligochaeta collection of the Museu de Zoologia of the University of São Paulo (Moreno & Mischis, 2003). In addition, his Amazonian material can be found at both the Instituto Nacional de Pesquisas da Amazônia, in Manaus, and the Museu Paraense Emílio Goeldi, in Belém.

A complete bibliography of Righi's publications on earthworms can be found in Mischis & Reynolds (1999).

In the words of Dr. Mischis, Righi's student and co-worker: "Professor Gilberto Righi was a man of science who over and above his achievements in the scientific field was a teacher and most of all a man of goodness" (Moreno & Mischis, 2003).
