= Guilherme "Bill" Cardoso =

Brazilian-American scientist (born 1976)

Bill Cardoso
- Cardoso in 2023
- Born: April 27, 1976 (age 50); Porto Alegre, Rio Grande do Sul, Brazil
- Education: The University of Chicago, Illinois Institute of Technology, Federal University of Rio Grande do Sul
- Known for: Best Engineered Vehicle of the Year SEMA '23
- Awards: Innovator of the Year Award - San Diego Business Journal (2015) Top 50 CEOs in Electronics - Industry Week (2019) Excellence in Engineering Award - Institute of Electrical and Electronics Engineers (IEEE) (2020) Entrepreneur of the Year - Carlsbad Chamber of Commerce (2021) Best Engineered Vehicle of the Year - SEMA (2023)
- Scientific career
- Fields: X-ray Inspection, Radiation Detection, Electric Vehicles, Entrepreneurship, Economics
- Workplaces: Creative Electron Inc., Scorpion-EV Inc.
- Thesis: Compression, Estimation, and Analysis of Ultrasonic Signals (2005)
- Doctoral advisor: Dr. Jafar Saniie

Guilherme "Bill" Cardoso (born April 27, 1976) is a Brazilian-American entrepreneur, engineer, and scientist. Cardoso is the founder of Creative Electron, Inc., an X-ray inspection systems manufacturer, and Scorpion-EV Inc., an electric vehicle manufacturer. He has over 25 years of experience driving technological breakthroughs in radiation detection, electronics, and high-performance electric vehicles.

Cardoso won the Best Engineered Vehicle of the Year at the 2023 SEMA show for his '23 Cobra Venom conversion kit build.

== Early life and education ==
Cardoso was born on April 27, 1976, in Porto Alegre, Rio Grande do Sul, Brazil, where he developed an early interest in engineering and technology. He earned his associate's degree from the Occidental School in Porto Alegre. He pursued a bachelor’s degree in Electrical and Computer Engineering from the Federal University of Rio Grande do Sul (UFRGS), Brazil, before moving to the United States for further education. He completed his master’s and Ph.D. in electrical and Computer Engineering at the Illinois Institute of Technology (IIT) in Chicago, Illinois.

Cardoso also holds an MBA from the University of Chicago, with a focus on strategic management, economy, and entrepreneurship. His multidisciplinary education laid the foundation for his career in developing high-tech solutions for industries ranging from nuclear physics to automotive engineering.

== Career ==
=== GCC ===
Cardoso started his first company, GCC (Guilherme Cardoso Corp), at the age of 17. He graduated from the Occidental School of Porto Alegre with an associate's degree in electronics at the age of 13. GCC manufactured and sold light switch dimmers in Porto Alegre.

=== Robotec Automation Systems ===
In the early 1990s, under the government of President Fernando Collor, Brazil began reducing import taxes on foreign-made electronics. After decades of protectionist policies implemented during the military dictatorship, the sudden influx of lower-cost imports disrupted Brazil’s industrial sector. In response to this economic shift, Cardoso founded Robotec in 1993. The company aimed to assist Brazilian firms in redeveloping products to remain competitive in the evolving market. Robotec specialized in providing electronic design solutions for industries ranging from automotive to medical and industrial sectors.

=== Fermilab ===
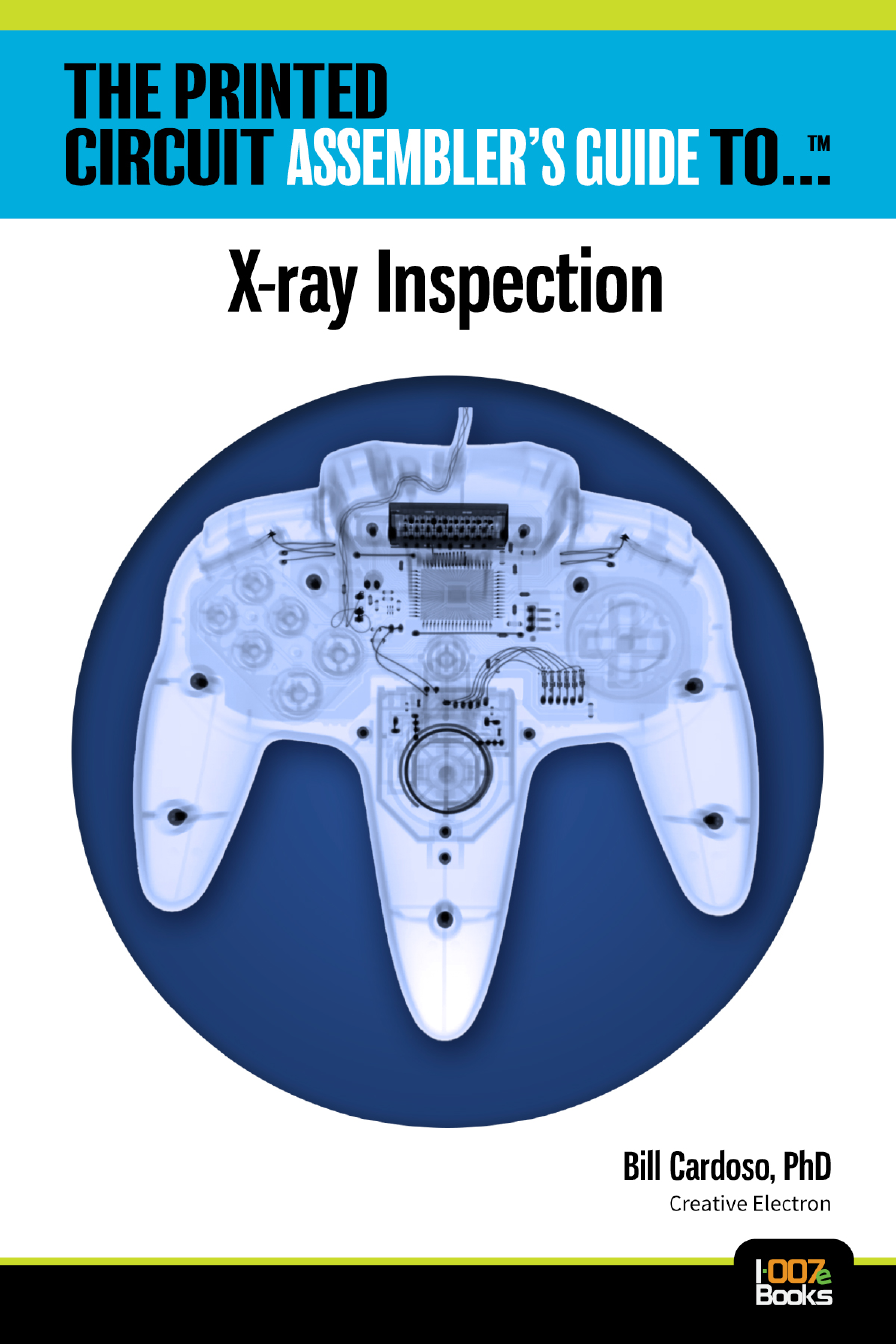
X-ray inspection book by Cardoso

After completing his education, Cardoso worked for over a decade at the Fermi National Accelerator Laboratory (Fermilab), where he led the Electronics Systems Engineering Department. At Fermilab, he was responsible for designing and developing radiation detector systems used in nuclear particle physics experiments. His work contributed to several high-profile projects, including developing a pixel radiation detector used in experiments to explore the structure of matter and the origins of the universe. Cardoso also contributed to the development of onboard electronics for NASA satellites and authored numerous technical papers on advanced semiconductor solutions and pixel detectors.

=== Aquila Technologies ===
Cardoso joined Aquila Technologies in 2007 and led it until his departure in 2008. Aguila focused on defense, medical imaging and radiation detection technologies. One of the company’s key innovations was the creation of the first handheld Radiation Threat Detector (RTD), capable of detecting, localizing, and identifying radiation sources within a wide energy range. His work at Aquila Technologies included securing over $1.5 million in research funding from various organizations, including the Department of Defense, Department of Homeland Security (DHS), Department of Energy (DOE), and the National Institutes of Health (NIH).

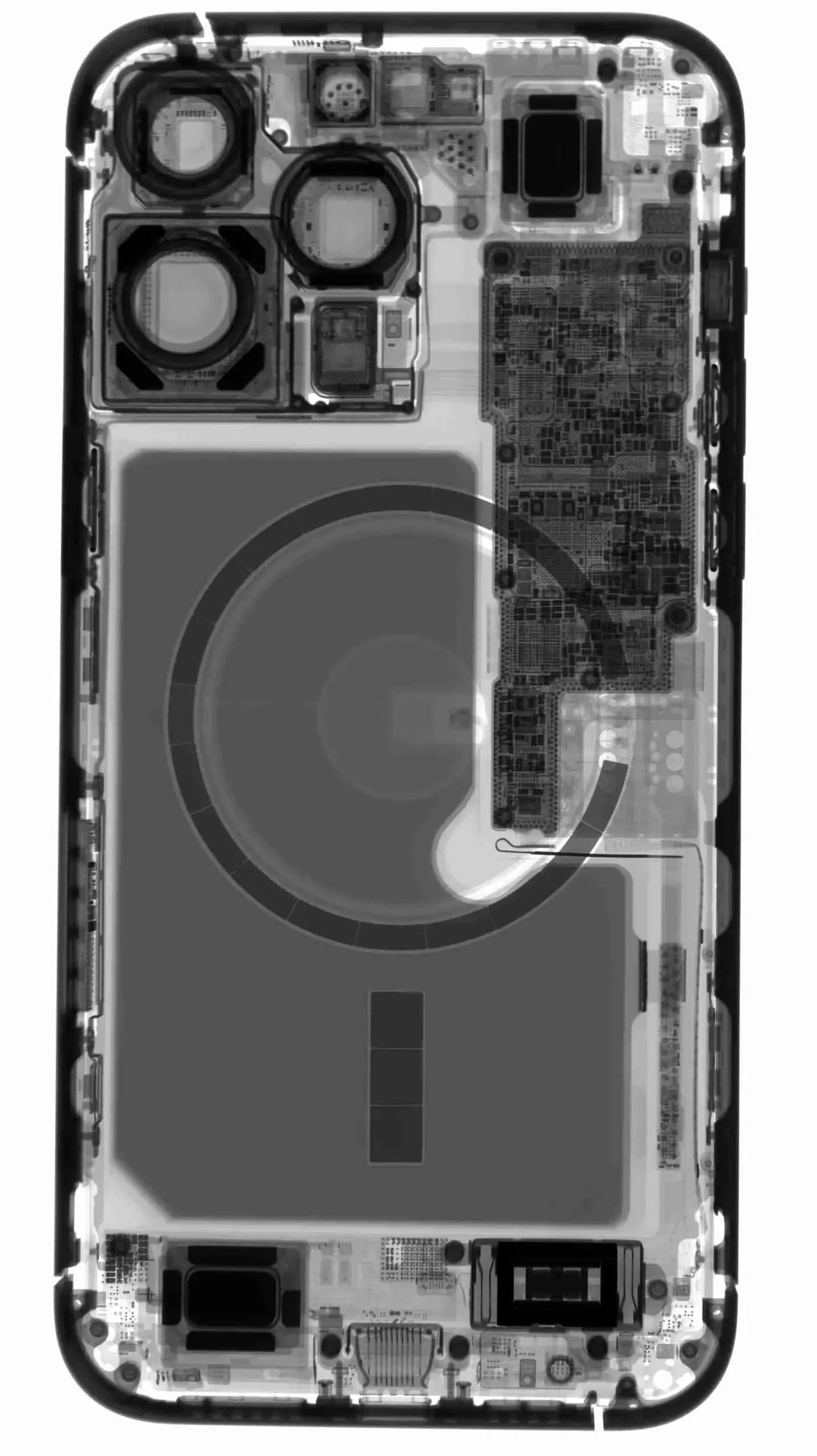
An X-ray of the iPhone 14 Pro

=== Creative Electron Inc. ===
Cardoso founded Creative Electron, Inc. in 2008, in San Marcos, California. The company specializes in the design and manufacturing of X-ray inspection systems used for non-destructive testing in industries such as electronics, aerospace, and medical devices. Creative Electron is one of the largest U.S. based manufacturers in the field of X-ray inspection, integrating advanced AI and machine learning technologies into its systems to automate and enhance quality control processes. Under Cardoso’s leadership, the company has secured several patents for innovations in X-ray imaging and inspection technology.

==== Creative Electron and iFixit x-ray case controversy ====
In November 2023, Creative Electron became involved in a public controversy when accusations arose against Casetify, a phone case manufacturer, for allegedly stealing X-ray images of iPhones originally created by Creative Electron. These X-ray images had been previously licensed to companies like iFixit and Dbrand, who used them for promotional phone cases. Dbrand and iFixit accused Casetify of using these X-ray images without permission, prompting public outcry.

According to reports, Casetify was selling phone cases featuring these X-ray images without licensing or acknowledgment of Creative Electron, the original creator. iFixit and Dbrand publicly criticized Casetify, with Dbrand mocking the incident in a social media campaign. The controversy highlighted ongoing issues of intellectual property misuse in the design and tech industries, bringing significant attention to Creative Electron's X-ray imaging technology.

==== The Printed Circuit Assembler’s Guide to… X-Ray Inspection ====
Cardoso is the author of The Printed Circuit Assembler’s Guide to… X-Ray Inspection, a technical reference book published by I-Connect007. The book provides an overview of X-ray inspection technologies used in electronics manufacturing, including the principles of X-ray imaging, system components, and applications in printed circuit board (PCB) assembly. It covers defect detection in surface-mount technology (SMT), as well as methodologies such as 2D and 3D (computed tomography) X-ray inspection. The work is intended as an introductory guide for engineers and manufacturers seeking to implement or better understand non-destructive testing techniques in electronics production.

=== Scorpion EV ===
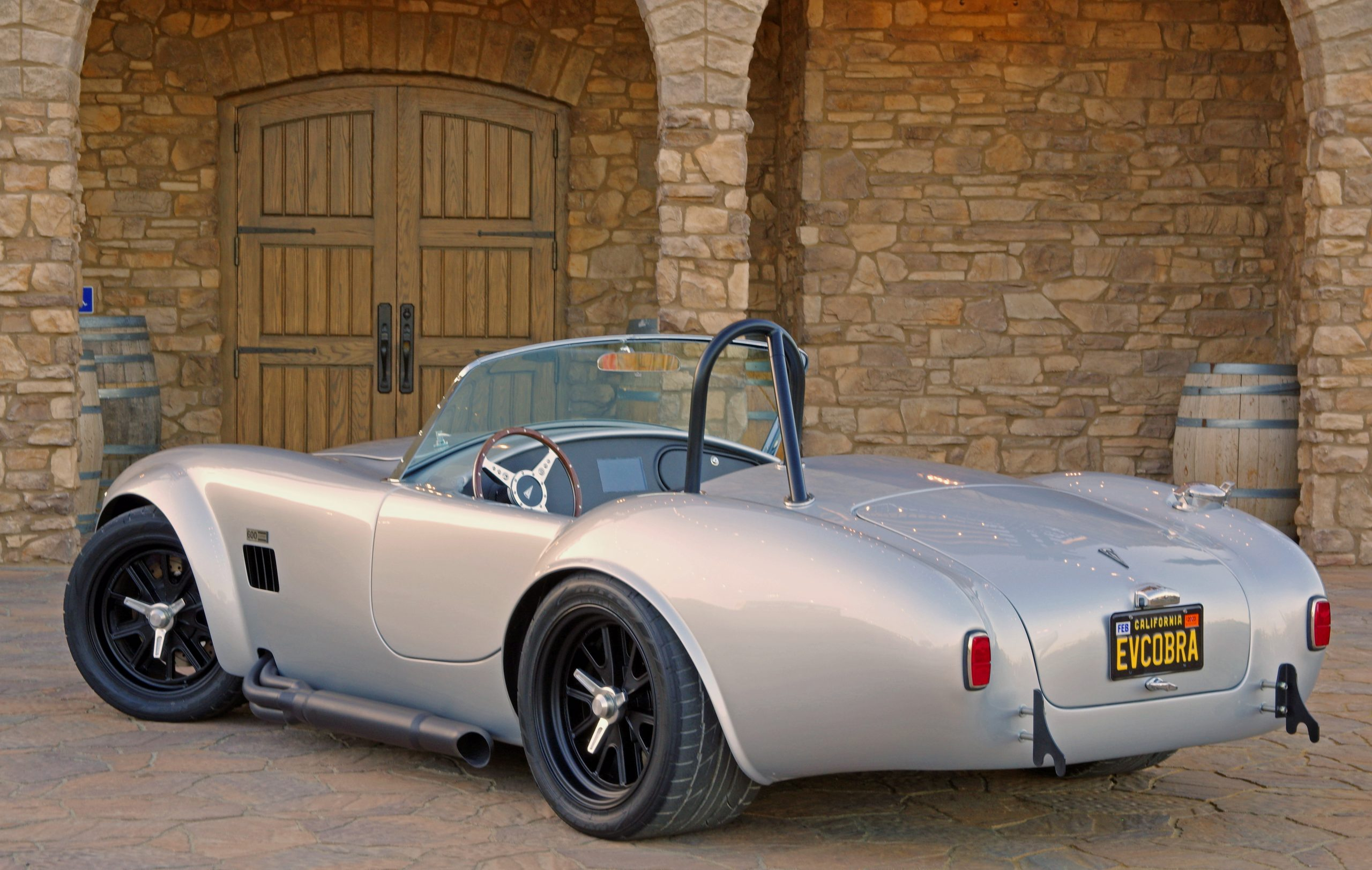
A production model Scorpion 600 EV

In 2021, during the COVID-19 pandemic lockdown, Cardoso founded Scorpion-EV, a company focused on producing high-performance electric vehicles and EV conversion kits.

In 2023, Cardoso received the inaugural SEMA Best Engineered Vehicle of the Year Award for the '23 Cobra Venom. This electric vehicle conversion car was designed to showcase Scorpion EV's Venom conversion kit, which simplifies the process of converting internal combustion engine vehicles to electric power. The award, presented at the SEMA Show, recognizes excellence in vehicle engineering and highlights the growing importance of EV technology in the automotive industry. The '23 Cobra Venom was celebrated for its innovation and ability to inspire engineers and builders to explore new possibilities in vehicle design and electrification.

=== Creative Farms ===
Cardoso founded Creative Farms in 2020. Creative Farms grows Chardonnay grapes, olives, avocados, oranges, lemons, and pomegranates in California. All of the products are organic and grown without pesticides.

== Philanthropy and mentorship ==
Cardoso sits on the Illinois Institute of Technology Electrical and Computer Engineering Department Board of Advisors.

Cardoso is committed to promoting STEM (Science, Technology, Engineering, and Mathematics) education. He actively supports initiatives that encourage underrepresented groups to pursue careers in engineering and technology. As part of this commitment, Creative Electron Inc and Scorpion EV Inc partner with MiraCosta Community College in Oceanside, California. This collaboration provides students with access to cutting-edge X-ray inspection technology, internship opportunities, guest lectures, and hands-on training to prepare them for careers in high-tech industries.

== Selected publications ==
- “Mapping CZT Charge Transport Parameters with Collimated X-Ray and Gamma-Ray Beams.” IEEE NSS/MIC/RTSD, 2008.
- “Sensitivity-Optimized Wide-Field Imaging with a CZT-Based Coded Mask Imager.” IEEE NSS/MIC/RTSD, 2008.
- "Reliability of pixellated CZT detector modules used for medical imaging and homeland security." SPIE, 2008.
- "Acoustic sensor array for sonic imaging in air." IEEE, 2010.
- “Readout ICs for High Spatial Resolution Slot-Scan Imaging with CZT or CdTe Pixel Arrays.” IEEE Transactions on Nuclear Science, 2004.
- “Study of Indium and Solder Bumps for the BTeV Pixel Detector.” IEEE Nuclear Science Symposium and Medical Imaging Conference, 2003.
- “Pixel Multichip Module Development at Fermilab.” Electronics for LHC and Future Experiments, 2005.
