= Carlos Hamilton Vasconcelos Araújo =

Carlos Hamilton

Banco do Brasil - Chief Financial Management and Investor Relations Officer (CFO)
- In office January 2019 – present

Personal details
- Born: August 4, 1964 (age 62) Ceará, Brazil
- Education: Fundação Getúlio Vargas
- Profession: Economist and Engineer

Carlos Hamilton Vasconcelos Araújo (born August 4, 1964) is graduated in civil engineering and holds an M.Sc. and a Ph.D. in economics. Previously, he was a member of the Risks and Capital Committee (2018/2019) and Chief of Services, Infrastructure and Operations Officer (2016–2018), both in Banco do Brasil. Since 2019, he is a member of the Board of Directos of Banco Votorantim, BB-BI, BB DTVM, BB Mapfre SH1, BB Elo Cartões, BB Cartões and BB Leasing.

He was a member of the board of directors of BB Seguridade Participações S.A. (2017–2018), Cielo (2019), Neoenergia (2016–2017) and RME (2017–2018). In 2016, he served as secretary of economic policy of the Ministry of Finance. Carlos Hamilton held the position of director of planning and strategy of Eldorado Brasil Celulose SA.

As a board member of Central Bank of Brazil, he was director of economic policy and director of international affairs (2010–2015), deputy chief and senior advisor of the Department of Studies and Research (2001–2010).

Hamilton holds a PhD and a master's degree in economics from the Getulio Vargas Foundation in Rio de Janeiro, Brazil. He is a trained civil engineer from the Federal University of Ceará.

Hamilton started his career at the Bank of Ceará State (1984–1990); after that he worked at the National Treasury from 1990 to 1992. Since 2000, he has held several positions at the Central Bank of Brazil, such as chief of the Open Market Trade Desk (2000–2001), senior advisor in the research department (2001–2005), deputy head of the research department (2005–2006), head of the research department (2006–2010), deputy governor for international affairs (2010) and deputy governor for economic policy (2010–2015).

Other activities include academic teaching at important business schools in Brazil, having lectured macroeconomics at FGV and at IBMEC, a business school in Rio de Janeiro.
