= Federal University of Rio Grande do Sul =

Federal university based in Porto Alegre, Brazil

Coordinates: 30°01′57″S 51°13′10″W

- Universidade Federal do Rio Grande do Sul
- Other name: UFRGS
- Former name: Universidade do Rio Grande do Sul (URGS)
- Type: Public
- Established: First school 1895, creation 1934, federalization 1950
- Endowment: US$500 million (2012)
- Rector: Márcia Cristina Bernardes Barbosa
- Faculty: 2,867 (2014)
- Administrative staff: 2,731 (2014)
- Undergraduates: 30,785 (2014)
- Postgraduates: 27,216 (2014)
- Doctoral students: 5,575 (2014)
- Other students: 855 (2014)
- Location: Porto Alegre, Rio Grande do Sul, Brazil
- Campus: Urban and suburban, 371,742 m² of constructed area (2008) and 2,185 ha of total area (2008)
- Website: www.ufrgs.br

The Federal University of Rio Grande do Sul (Portuguese: Universidade Federal do Rio Grande do Sul, UFRGS, commonly known as its former abbreviation, URGS) is a Brazilian public federal research university based in Porto Alegre, Rio Grande do Sul. UFRGS is among the largest and highest-rated universities in Brazil, having one of the largest number of scientific publications. From 2012 to 2019, the university was elected as the best federal university of Brazil. UFRGS has over 31,000 undergraduate students, over 12,000 graduate students, and more than 2,600 faculty members. As a Brazilian public federal institution, students do not pay tuition fees to enroll in courses offered by the university.

Among the main alumni affiliated with UFRGS, there are three former presidents of Brazil, former state governors, former members of the Supreme Federal Court, members of the Brazilian Academy of Letters and important Brazilian actors, musicians and journalists.

== History ==
UFRGS Entrance

The university originated from the Escola de Farmácia e Química (School of Pharmacy and Chemistry) in 1895. It was expanded in 1896, when the Engineering College was created. This was the beginning of higher education in Rio Grande do Sul. In the end of the 19th century, the Medicine and Law schools were founded, the latter being the first school of humanities tertiary education in the state.

In November 1934, the Universidade de Porto Alegre (University of Porto Alegre) was founded, initially composed of the following units:

- Engineering School, with its Astronomy, Electrical and Industrial Chemistry institutes;
- Medical College, with its Dentistry and Pharmacy institutes;
- Law College, with the School of Commerce;
- Communication College (called FABICO), which comprises the Journalism, Advertising and Public Relations programs;
- Agricultural Science and Veterinary Medicine Colleges;
- Philosophy, Science and Linguistics Colleges; and
- Institute of Fine Arts

The third transformation took place in 1947, when it became the Universidade do Rio Grande do Sul (University of Rio Grande do Sul), URGS, incorporating the Law and Dentistry Colleges from Pelotas and with the Pharmacy College from Santa Maria. These units, however, separated from URGS when the Federal University of Pelotas and the Federal University of Santa Maria were founded.

In December 1950, control of the university passed to the Federal Government. After that, the name of the institution became Universidade Federal do Rio Grande do Sul (Federal University of Rio Grande do Sul). The institute also has a profound political history. Between 1964 and 1969, during the worst years of the military dictatorship, 33 professors were eliminated, as well as a good number of students. Many high-ranking officials, including three presidents - Getúlio Vargas, João Goulart and Dilma Rousseff - as well as the majority of the history, philosophy and social sciences teachers in smaller universities throughout the state were educated in the institution. The climate of intellectual debate and analysis of public issues has also been important in training students (often with scholarships and/or student apprenticeships) to work for non-governmental and governmental organisations which contribute to the critical reflection and planning of development programs.

== Organization ==
UFRGS is almost completely located in Porto Alegre, with four campuses: Campus Centro (Downtown Campus), Campus Saúde (Health Sciences Campus), Campus Olímpico (Olympic Campus, housing the School of Physical Education, Physiotherapy and Dance) and Campus do Vale (Vale Campus), a few off-campus buildings (including the Business School and the Institute of Arts) and units in other cities, such as the Agriculture Experimental Station and the Campus Litoral Norte (a new campus in the state's northeastern coastal city of Tramandaí).

=== Infrastructure ===
Offering graduate and undergraduate courses, UFRGS is the largest university of Rio Grande do Sul. Its more than 300 buildings accommodate 29 faculties, schools and institutes, which are divided into 94 departments.

The university spreads through 2,185 ha, and it has 402,000 m^{2} of constructed area. It is divided into four campuses and minor units (see above).

The undergraduate program's students make up for a population of about 31 thousand students, while the graduate program has 12 thousand students. The elementary, high-school and technical school sum up to 1,300 students.

The university's infrastructure comprises more than 500 laboratories, 33 libraries, 37 lecture halls, the Hospital de Clínicas de Porto Alegre (the university's clinical research hospital), UFRGS Press, UFRGS Museum, Botanical Garden, Broadcasting Center, Observatory, 3 buildings for Campus Accommodation, 5 refectories, 2 summer camps and several other centers and facilities.

=== Colleges, Institutes, and Schools ===
(Source:)

- College of Architecture (Faculdade de Arquitetura)
- College of Communication (Facultade de Biblioteconomia e Comunicação)
- College of Economics (Faculdade de Ciências Econômicas)
- College of Education (Faculdade de Educação)
- College of Law (Faculdade de Direito)
- College of Pharmacy (Faculdade de Farmácia)
- College of Medicine (Faculdade de Medicina)
- College of Dentistry (Faculdade de Odontologia)
- College of Veterinary Medicine (Faculdade de Veterinária)
- Institute of Biosciences (Instituto de Biociências)
- Institute of Chemistry (Instituto de Química)
- Institute of Fine Arts (Instituto de Artes)
- Institute of Food Technology (Instituto de Ciência e Tecnologia de Alimentos)
- Institute of Geosciences
- Institute of Health Sciences (Instituto de Ciências Básicas da Saúde)
- Institute of Hydraulic Research (Instituto de Pesquisas Hidráulicas)
- Institute of Informatics (Instituto de Informática)
- Institute of Linguistics, Languages and Literature (Instituto de Letras)
- Institute of Mathematics and Statistics (Instituto de Matemática)
- Institute of Philosophy and Human Sciences (Instituto de Filosofia e Ciências Humanas)
- Institute of Physics (Instituto de Física)
- Institute of Psychology (Instituto de Psicologia)
- School of Agronomy (Faculdade de Agronomia)
- School of Engineering (Escola de Engenharia)
- School of Management (Escola de Administração)
- School of Nursing (Escola de Enfermagem)
- School of Sports (Escola de Educação Física)

=== Other units ===
==== SECOM ====
SECOM is an executive office of UFRGS directly connected to the Central Administration's cabinet – as well as to other sectors and the Provosts' Offices. SECOM defines the communication policies and strategies employed by UFRGS, facilitating services inside the university through the creation of informative and institutional materials. Its goal is to promote new activities and establish initiatives which recognize and publicize the institution's potential. Some of its sections are the university newspaper, TV channel and radio station.

==== Hospital ====
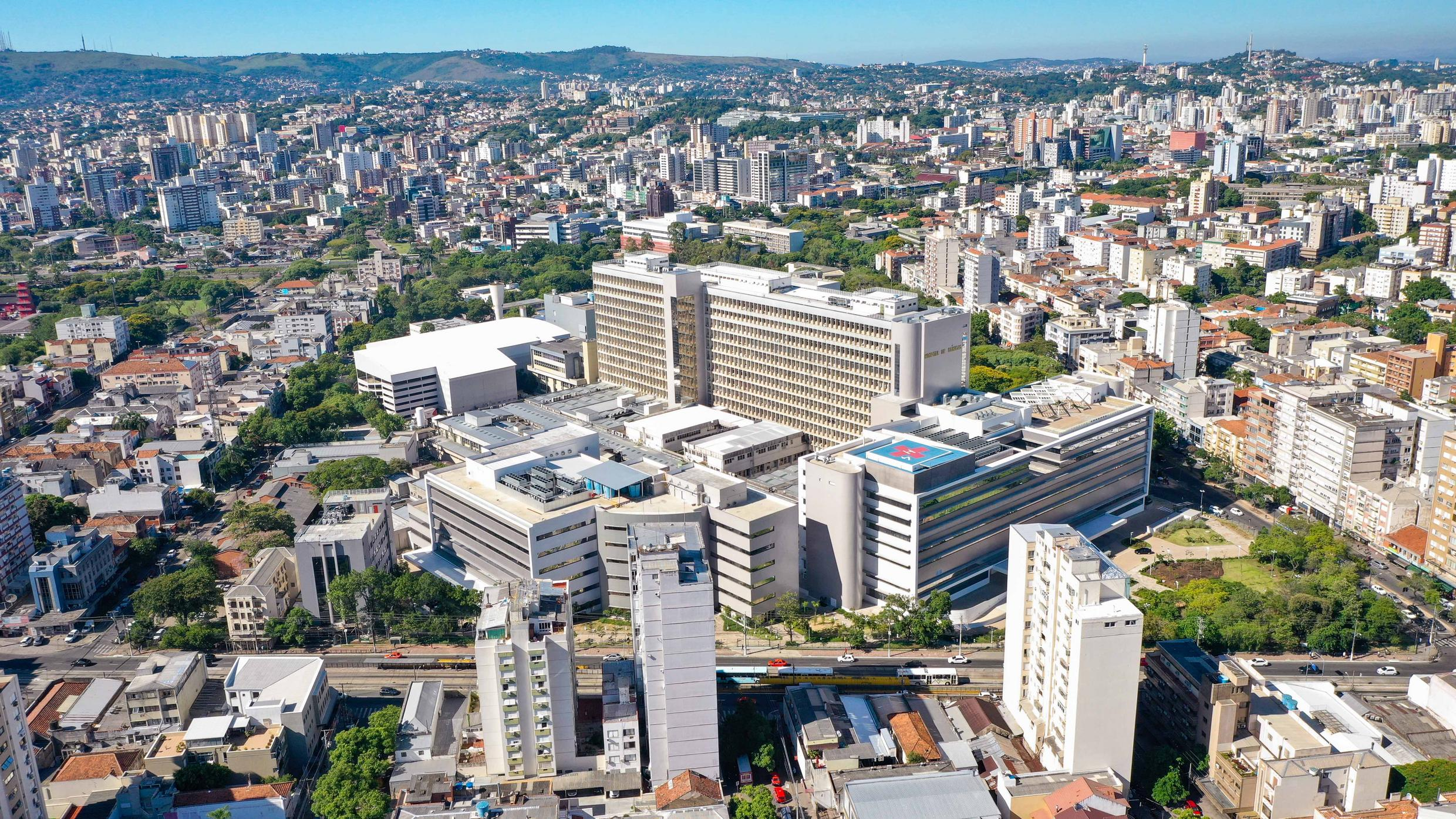
University Hospital building in Porto Alegre.

UFRGS university hospital is located in the centre of Porto Alegre.

HCPA in Figures - Operations
	2009	2010
Consultations	562,507	577,504
Exams	2,811,277	2,767,804
Operations	41,281	42,121
Transplants	411	412

HCPA in Figures - HR
	2009	2010
Staff	4,499	4,578
Professors	290	283
Residents	344	414
Undergraduate students	2,100	1,966
Graduate students	559	590
PhD students	300	395
Training hours	200.162	214.576

== Research ==
Undergraduate Research Grant Program

The objective of the Undergraduate Research Internship Program is to integrated students from undergraduate courses into research activities, technological development and, innovation. Besides contributing for students’ academic and professional growth, the program also offers the opportunity to take part in the community of the university researchers fostering dialogue between undergraduate and graduate programs.

Research Promotion Program

The research promotion program has as goal to support the continuity of research projects, the organization of events and the qualification of technical and administrative personnel, besides stimulating the national and international exposure of works made in research by professors, technical and administrative personnel, and students.

Science in Society and Science in School Program

This program has the compromise of stimulating university developed projects which are turned to popularization and spreading of science and technology in a variety of social groups and in school environment, through participation of UFRGS undergraduate students, in activities which enable the permanent development of human capital in these areas.

Journal Editing Supporting Program

The Journal Editing Supporting Program implements ways of support and stimulus for journal editing at UFRGS. Its objective is to grant visibility to scientific periodicals of the institution.

== Admission ==
Students are accepted through the vestibular, which is an open examination where the top-placed candidates are offered a placement at the university. Since UFRGS is free of charge, the Vestibular is usually a very hard examination since there are many candidates for few open placements. Examinations take place in January and classes begin in March.

=== ENEM ===
The Federal University of Rio Grande do Sul, as well as the other Brazilian federal universities, adopted the National High School Examination (ENEM) in 2010 as a standard of admission. The applicants’ participation in ENEM is optative. Initially, their performances in the examination were analyzed together with their performances in the university entrance exam, comprehending 10% of the final grade. However, as of 2019, UFRGS decided to withdraw the sum of 10% in the final score, having only vacancies through the National High School Exam (30%) and/or through the Vestibular (70%).

== Quality of education ==
University rankings

Global – Overall
- ARWU World: 401-500 (2020)
- QS World: =691 (2026)

According to the ranking sponsored by the Ministry of Education (MEC, Ministério da Educação), UFRGS is Brazil's best university (in a ranking which doesn't include Universidade de São Paulo—see rankings of universities in Brazil for details). According to the Webometrics Ranking of World Universities in 2012, UFRGS was placed 71st worldwide.

== Notable alumni ==
Law School

- Ellen Gracie Northfleet, lawyer and Supreme Court Justice
- Germano Rigotto, politician and former State governor
- Getúlio Vargas, 14th and 17th President of Brazil
- João Goulart, 24th President of Brazil
- Jorge Gerdau Johannpeter, businessman, chairman of Gerdau
- Nelson Jobim, former Supreme Court Justice and defence minister
- Nathercia da Cunha Silveira, suffragist and first woman to earn a law degree in Rio Grande do Sul
- Rosa Weber, Supreme Court Justice

Philosophy and Social Sciences

- Raul Pont, politician and former Porto Alegre mayor
- Gerd Bornheim, philosopher
- Helgio Trindade, political scientist and former dean of UFRGS

School of Medicine

- Gustavo S. Oderich, American vascular surgeon and professor
- Patricia Pranke, stem cell researcher
- Moacyr Scliar, writer
- José de Jesus Peixoto Camargo, Brazilian thoracic surgeon, writer and lecturer

School of Mathematics

- Marco Antonio Raupp, Professor of Mathematics, former Minister of Science, Technology and Innovation.

Engineering School

- Leonel de Moura Brizola, politician and former State governor
- José Mauro Volkmer de Castilho, engineer
- Helena Amélia Oehler Stemmer civil engineer and university professor
- Guilherme "Bill" Cardoso engineer, entrepreneur, scientist

Agronomy School

- José Lutzenberger, agronomist and ecologist

School of Economics

- Paulo Renato Souza, politician, education minister 1995–2002
- Dilma Rousseff, politician and the 36th President of Brazil

School of Fine Arts

- Jorge Furtado, actor
- Radamés Gnattali, musician
- Guilherme Dable, artist

Linguistics School

- Caio Fernando Abreu, writer
- João Gilberto Noll, writer
- Lya Luft, writer
- Olívio Dutra, politician and former State governor

Architecture School

- Humberto Gessinger, musician

=== History ===
- Lauri Miranda Silva, Professor

== Notable faculty ==
- Adriana Neumann de Oliveira
- Artur Oscar Lopes
- Irajá Damiani Pinto
- Ivan Izquierdo
- Jairton Dupont
- Kepler de Souza Oliveira
- Mara Alvares
- Marcia Barbosa
- Miriani Griselda Pastoriza (born 1939), astronomer
- Patricia Pranke
- Thaisa Storchi Bergmann
- Fernanda Staniscuaski

== Statistics ==
2014 Figures

- Foundation year: 1934 (first college founded in 1895)
- Total area: 22,704,212 m ^{2}
- Built area: 402,677m^{2}
- Undergraduate school (4-6 year course):

- Number of courses offered: 95
- Number of students: 31,587

- Graduate school (Masters: 2-year course; PhD: 4-year course; Lato sensu programs: 2-year course):

- Number of masters courses offered: 90 (academic masters) + 16 (professional masters)
- Number of PhD programs offered: 83
- Number of lato sensu (year one post-graduate diploma) courses offered: 114 running; 168 concluded
- Graduate students: 23,298

- Staff:

- Number of professors: 2,749, from which 89.13% with a PhD
- Administrative staff: 2,731
- Total staff: 5,480

- Research

- Number of research groups: 900
- Number of professors with registered research project(s): 2,184
- Number of undergraduation students joining research projects: 2,945

- Partnerships with other institutions:

- Foreign institutions: 128
- National institutions

Public: 253
Private: 212

- Total number of partnerships: 593

== See also ==
- Brazil University Rankings
- List of federal universities of Brazil
- Universities and Higher Education in Brazil
