= Pan-American Congress =

Pan-American Congress may refer to:

- Congress of Panama, in 1826
- Pan-American Conference, periodic meetings of the Pan-American Union
- Pan-American Conference of Women, Baltimore 1922
  - First International Conference of American States, the first such meeting, in 1889–1890
