= Instituto de Letras =

The Instituto de Letras (Institute of Letters) is a teaching unit of the Federal University of Rio Grande do Sul, located in the Campus do Vale, Porto Alegre, Brazil. It was created in 1970 as the Central Institute of Letters with the following departments: Classical and Vernacular Letters, Modern Languages and Linguistics and Philology. The bachelor's degree course was created in 1973 and recognized in 1977, which created the qualification of Translator and Interpreter. The institute now offers undergraduate and postgraduate courses in a diverse range of language studies, such as Linguistics, Philology and Literary Theory.

== History ==
The Languages, Literature and Linguistics Teaching Course was created at UFRGS in 1943 offering three different teaching majors: Classical Languages, Neo-Latin Languages and Germanic Languages.

The School of Languages, Literature and Linguistics was created in 1970 and established three departments: Department of Portuguese and Classical Languages, Department of Modern Languages and Department of Philology, Linguistics and Literary Theory. In 1973, the Translation major was created.

== Departments ==
School of Languages, Literature and Linguistics of UFRGS is divided into three departments:

Department of Portuguese and Classical Languages

Coordinator: José Carlos Baracat Jr.

Substitute Coordinator: Laura Rosane Quednau

Sectors

- Portuguese
- Brazilian Literature
- Portuguese Literature
- Latin
- Greek

Department of Modern Languages

Coordinator: Susana Termignoni

Substitute Coordinator: Márcia Montenegro Velho

Secretary: Karina Braz Marchetti

Sectors

- German
- Spanish
- French
- English
- Italian
- Japanese
- Russian

Department of Linguistics, Philology and Literary Theory

Coordinator: Luiz Carlos da Silva Schwindt

Substitute Coordinator: Rita Lenira de Freitas Bittencourt

Secretary: Maria Luíza B. Machado

Sectors

- Linguistics
- Literary Theory

== Professors ==
Department of Modern Languages

- Anamaria Kurtz de Souza Welp (English)
- Andrei dos Santos Cunha (Japanese)
- Beatriz Cerisara Gil (French)
- Cláudia Mendonça Scheeren (Italian)
- Cleci Regina Bevilacqua (Spanish)
- Cléo Vilson Altenhofen (German)
- Daniela Norci Schroeder (Italian)
- Eda Heloísa Pilla (English)
- Elaine Barros Indrusiak (English)
- Elizamari Rodrigues Becker (English)
- Erica Sofia Foertmann Schultz (German)
- Eunice Polónia (English)
- Félix Miranda (Spanish)
- Florence Carboni (Italian)
- Gerson Roberto Neumann (German)
- Heloísa Monteiro Rosário (French)
- Ingrid Finger (English)
- June Campos (English)
- Karen Pupp Spinassé (German)
- Márcia Hoppe Navarro (Spanish)
- Márcia Montenegro Velho (English)
- Margarete Schlatter (English)
- Maria Lúcia Machado de Lorenci (Spanish)
- Marta Ramos Oliveira (English)
- Michael Korfmann (German)
- Mônica Narino Rodrigues (Spanish)
- Patrícia Ramos Reuillard (French)
- Rita Teresinha Schimidt (English)
- Roberto Pinheiro Machado (Japanese)
- Rosa Maria de Oliveira Graça (French)
- Rosalia Angelita N. Garcia (English)
- Ruben Daniel M. Castiglioni (Spanish)
- Sandra Dias Loguércio (French)
- Sandra Sirangelo Maggio (English)
- Sara Viola Rodrigues (English)
- Sônia Terezinha Gehring (English)
- Simone Sarmento (English)
- Susana Termignoni (Italian)
- Tanira Castro (Russian)
- Tomoko Gaudioso (Japanese)
- Ubiratã Kickhöfel Alves (English)

== Undergraduate Program ==
=== Courses offered ===
Translation Major

- Translator: Portuguese and English
- Translator: Portuguese and French
- Translator: Portuguese and German
- Translator: Portuguese and Italian
- Translator: Portuguese and Japanese
- Translator: Portuguese and Spanish

Teaching Major

- English Language and Literatures in English Language
- French Language and Literature in French Language
- German Language and Literature in German Language
- Italian Language and Literature in Italian Language
- Portuguese Language and Literatures in Portuguese Language
- Spanish Language and Literatures in Spanish Language
- Portuguese Language and Literatures in Portuguese Language, English Language and Literatures in English Language
- Portuguese Language and Literatures in Portuguese Language, French Language and Literature in French Language
- Portuguese Language and Literatures in Portuguese Language, German Language and Literature in German Language
- Portuguese Language and Literatures in Portuguese Language, Greek Language and Literature in Greek Language
- Portuguese Language and Literatures in Portuguese Language, Italian Language and Literature in Italian Language
- Portuguese Language and Literatures in Portuguese Language, Latin Language and Literature in Latin Language
- Portuguese Language and Literatures in Portuguese Language, Spanish Language and Literatures in Spanish Language

== Post-Graduate Program Objectives ==
Our post-graduate program provides qualification for researchers and teachers who already work in, or intend to pursue, a career in further educational institutions. The majority of our students (around 90%) are graduates working as teachers at primary and secondary institutions, who come here to benefit from our training and seek an improvement in their professional qualifications. On a small scale, it also qualifies teachers who seek to improve their professional training and develop research on the institutions in which they teach. Apart from these, it qualifies translating, linguistic and literary study professionals. We can also highlight the fact that many professionals in other fields, such as journalists, anthropologists, psychologists and psychiatrists join our post graduate program due to its interdisciplinary faculty.

== Academic Publishing ==
The Institute of Languages, Literature and Linguistics of UFRGS endorses academic journals, such as Organon, Nau Literária, Cadernos do IL and others.

Organon is the main academic journal from the institute. Its focus is the publication of new essays on Linguistics and Literary Theory.

Nau Literária is an electronic journal that publishes essays and reviews written not only in Portuguese, but also in English, French, Spanish, Italian and German. It is affiliated to the University of Évora and the Nova Lisboa University, both from Portugal.

Cadernos do IL publishes new articles and essays on Language and Literary Studies. Its focus is on the academic production from graduate and undergraduate students.

== Termisul ==
Termisul is the group in charge of the Terminologic Project Cone Sul, originated at the School of Languages, Literature and Linguistics in 1991, under the leadership of Maria da Graça Krieger. It counts with the participation of professors from the Department of Portuguese and Classical Languages and from the Department of Modern Languages.

To make a progress in theoretical and applied research in terminology is its ultimate goal. Its theoretical and methodological choice puts terminology on the perspective of specialized language, expressed in technical and scientific texts.

The group committed itself to the development of terminological studies at the Federal University of Rio Grande do Sul and to the introduction of terminology, as a mandatory subject in the curriculum of the Translation Major of the School of Languages, Literature and Linguistics. In the Graduate Program, the group also proposed the inclusion of a subject about Lexicography and Terminology. In this context, Doctoral Thesis and Dissertations were produced.

Termisul specifically aims at developing terminographic tools as a result of research undertaken and as a feeding source for the work of researchers. They have published the Dictionary of Environmental Law and the Multilingual Glossary of International Environmental Law. In addition, the Environmental Law data base was implemented (BDT Termisul), now disabled, and its material originated the Termisul collection.

== Distance Learning ==
The Distance Learning Department encourages knowledge production and development of human resources. For all the distance, the hybrid and the face-to-face courses, this department uses the internet and, in particular, Moodle and ALED platform (Aprendizagem de Línguas Estrangueiras à Distância – Foreign Languages’ Distance Learning).

Through NUED’s extension activities and a research work started in 1999, such Institute intends to foster the Distance Education, in order to contributing to a more democratic and including teaching. Besides, it’s also our objective to preserve the qualified knowledge production already achieved by the face-to-face classroom courses.

== Undergraduate curriculum reform ==
Since 2009, the School of Languages, Literature and Linguistics of UFRGS has been discussing major curriculum changes. This reform aims at simplifying the Undergraduate curriculum and adequating it to the Brazilian Federal Government’s University Reform Program (REUNI). There has been public discussion on the subject and all relevant papers are available at the School’s webpage.

== Notes and references ==
- https://web.archive.org/web/20110727140547/http://www6.ufrgs.br/letras/index.php?option=com_content&view=article&id=48&Itemid=54
- https://web.archive.org/web/20110926165759/http://www1.ufrgs.br/graduacao/xInformacoesAcademicas/habilitacoes.php?CodCurso=334
