= Human embryonic stem cells clinical trials =

The Food and Drug Administration (FDA) approved the first clinical trial in the United States involving human embryonic stem cells on January 23, 2009. Geron Corporation, a biotechnology firm located in Menlo Park, California, originally planned to enroll ten patients with spinal cord injuries to participate in the trial. The company hoped that GRNOPC1, a product derived from human embryonic stem cells, would stimulate nerve growth in patients with debilitating damage to the spinal cord. The trial began in 2010 after being delayed by the FDA because cysts were found on mice injected with these cells, and safety concerns were raised.

== FDA approval process ==
In the United States, the FDA must approve all clinical trials involving newly developed pharmaceuticals. Researchers must complete an Investigational New Drug (IND) application in order to earn the FDA's approval. IND applications typically include data from animal and toxicology studies in which the drug's safety is tested, drug manufacturing information explaining how and where the drug will be produced, and a detailed research protocol stating who will be included in the study, how the drug will be administered and how participants will be consented. Testing for new drugs must successfully go through three phases of research before a drug can be marketed to the public. In Phase I trials, the drug's safety is tested on a small group of participants. The drug's effectiveness is tested during Phase II trials with a larger number of participants. Phase III trials, involving 1,000- 3,000 participants, analyze effectiveness, determine side effects and compare the outcomes of the new drug to similar drugs on the market. An additional phase, Phase IV, is included to continually gain information after a drug is on the market. Geron's IND application for the GRNOPC1 clinical trial, nearly 28,000 pages in length, was one of the most extensive applications ever to be submitted to the FDA.

== Pre-clinical data ==
Before Geron could test GRNOPC1 in humans, tests in animals had to occur. At the University of California at Irvine, Dr. Hans Keirstead and Dr. Gabriel Nistor, credited with the technique used to develop oligodendrocytes from human embryonic stem cells, injected the cells into rats with spinal cord injuries. The condition of the rats improved after treatment.

== Geron spinal cord injury trial ==
The first patient, identified in an article by the Washington Post as Timothy J. Atchison of Alabama, enrolled in the trial in October 2010. The patient was treated at the Shepherd Center in Atlanta, GA just two weeks after he sustained a spinal cord injury in a car accident. The Shepherd Center and six other spinal centers were recruited by Geron to participate in the clinical trial. The Washington Post reported that Atchison "has begun to get some very slight sensation: He can feel relief when he lifts a bowling ball off his lap and discern discomfort when he pulls on hairs on some parts of his legs. He has also strengthened his abdomen." Atchison underwent therapy at the Shepherd Center for three months before returning home to Alabama.

Although Geron aimed to enroll ten patients in the trial, only three additional patients were added after Atchison. As specified by Geron, eligible patients had to experience a neurologically complete spinal cord injury within seven to fourteen days prior to enrollment. In addition, patients had to be between the ages of 18 and 65 and could not have a history of malignancy, significant organ damage, be pregnant or nursing, unable to communicate or participate in any other experimental procedures. Participants received one injection of GRNOPC1 containing approximately 2 million cells. Even though the trial has officially ended, Geron will continue to monitor participants for fifteen years.

Preliminary results from the clinical trial were presented at the American Congress of Rehabilitation Medicine (ACRM) conference in October 2011. None of the participants experienced serious adverse events, although nausea and low magnesium were reported. In addition, no changes to the spinal cord or neurological condition were found.

After investing millions of dollars in research, Geron Corporation discontinued the study in November 2011 to focus on cancer research. John Scarlett, Geron's chief executive officer, said "In the current environment of capital scarcity and uncertain economic conditions, we intend to focus our resources on advancing our two novel and promising oncology drug candidates." The company's stocks fell to $1.50 per share from $2.28 per share when news of the trial's discontinuation became public. A spokesperson for the company said that Geron would save money by ending the trial despite the loss in investors. Because many believed Geron's trial offered hope for advancing knowledge related to stem cells and their potential uses, there was disappointment in the scientific community when the trial was cut short. An article on Bioethics Forum, a publication produced by The Hastings Center, stated, "It is one thing to close a trial to further enrollment for scientific reasons, such as a problem with trial design, or for ethical reasons, such as an unanticipated serious risk of harm to participants. It is quite another matter to close a trial for business reasons, such as to improve profit margins."

In 2013 Geron's stem cell assets were acquired by biotechnology firm BioTime, led by CEO Michael D. West, the founder of Geron and former Chief Scientific Officer of Advanced Cell Technology. BioTime said it planned to restart the embryonic stem cell-based clinical trial for spinal cord injury.

== ACT Stargardt's macular dystrophy and dry age-related macular degeneration clinical trial ==
Two clinical trials involving derivatives of human embryonic stem cells were approved in 2010. Advanced Cell Technology (ACT) located in Marlborough, Massachusetts, leads the trials aimed at improving the vision of patients with Stargardt's Macular Dystrophy and Dry Age-Related Macular Degeneration. Originally, twelve patients were estimated to enroll at three hospitals in the U.S.; participating institutions included the Casey Eye Institute in Portland, Oregon, University of Massachusetts Memorial Medical Center in Worcester, Massachusetts, and the New Jersey Medical School in Newark, New Jersey. Patients' eyes were injected with retinal pigmented epithelial cells derived from human embryonic stem cells. While no definitive findings from this study have been produced, an article published in Lancet in January 2012 stated that preliminary findings appear to be promising. In this article, outcomes from two patients treated as part of the trial were discussed. During the trial, neither patients' vision worsened, and no negative side effects were reported.

Phase I/II clinical trials involving retinal pigment epithelial (RPE) cells, derived from human embryonic stem cells, for the treatment of severe myopia were approved in February 2013.

== ViaCyte Human stem cell-derived beta cells for the treatment of Diabetes Clinical Trial ==
The FDA approved a phase I clinical trial with ViaCyte beta cells derived from human embryonic stem cell for the treatment of diabetes in August 2014. The cells were delivered in immunoprotective capsules and pre-clinical results in animal models showed remission of symptoms within a few months. The company reported the successful transplantation of the cells in the first 40 patients treated in late October 2014.

== Future funding ==
As state funding for human embryonic stem cell research grows, there seems to be more support for state sponsored clinical trials. In 2010, California committed fifty million dollars to early-stage clinical trials. Although approved trials must take place in California, scientists are hopeful that this funding will bolster future research in the field.

== See also ==
- Retinal pigment epithelium
- Spinal cord injury research
