= Santiago Americano Freire =

Brazilian scientist

Santiago Americano Freire (1908 – May 24, 1997) was a scientist of many interests and fields of works in science and culture.

== Education ==
He attended high school at the Colegio Militar de Realengo, Rio de Janeiro (Military College) and got his medical degree in 1932, at the Faculdade Nacional de Medicina, (National Faculty of Medicine), in the city of Rio de Janeiro. After graduation he established his medicine practice in Guarapuava, state of Paraná.

He got his interest for the study of the human mind and psychiatry when he was a resident student in the Hospício Nacional da Praia Vermelha in the city of Rio de Janeiro (National Hospice of Praia Vermelha). He was discontented with the scientific and financial resources for the treatment of mental patients and not attracted to psychiatry at that time. He had been even psychoanalyzed and was initiated in the psychoanalytic activities, but he could not "see the possibility of being of help to his heart content".

== Career ==
From 1942 onwards, he conquered a chair of Pharmacology and Experimental Therapeutics in the Medicine Faculty of the Universidade Federal de Minas Gerais (UFMG) where he worked for 30 years. Besides a M.D., he became an expert on pharmacology and acquired a conspicuous exactness on the methodology of experimental science and developed with many of his students, a series of drugs and obtained many active extracts of Brazilian tropical plants.

Freire was able to reconcile his duties of his chair of Pharmacology with his clinical practice as a M.D. and did research and developed concepts on the development of psychoses and neuroses. He supported the theory of “imprinting”, of “reconditioned reflex” one of the conditioner of neurosis syndromes and created a theory of four new neuroses: the Rejection Syndrome, the Neurosis of Hate, the Neuroses of Insecurity- Anxiety and the Neurosis of the Incestuous Links.

== Publications ==
All his research results, with documented case histories of his clinic and also those described by Freud, were object of his book Neurosanálise,( Neurosisanalysis) published in 1977, by the Printing House of the UFMG. This book is well known by the psychoanalytic circles of Rio de Janeiro and Minas Gerais states.

Because he brings new ideas contrary to the concepts of the psychoanalytic establishment he has been much criticized, causing controversy. Particularly, because his book provided methodology to make a brief analysis of neurotic patients in about 20 to 30 minutes. In many cases, he achieved the cure of his patients in weeks or a couple of years; he also succeeded to improve the behavior of autistic children, in the Instituto Pestalozzi in collaboration with Helena Antipoff. Besides the development of his theoretical concepts his book contains sections on the "techniques for the precocious diagnosis and brief therapy of neuroses" and about 132 references on which he based his ideas. He applied this techniques till the very day of his sudden death in 1997, when he had an alleged heart failure while he was closing manually the iron-gate of his house garage.

After publishing of his neuroanalysis, Santiago started writing a new book on Psichosisanalysis: dealing with the psychodynamic, genetics and neurochemistry of the pathogenesis of schizophrenics. He introduced part of his book in lectures in the Associação Médica de Minas Gerais (“Medical Association of Minas Gerais”) and the Academia Mineira de Medicina(“ Medicine Academy of Minas Gerais”. In both these institutions he also gave lectures on the Cosmic Origin of the Biological Rhythms and Creativity and Unconscious of Carl Gustav Young.

In the 15 years prior to his death he work and wrote hard and extensively, and left both in Portuguese and English final digitized manuscripts which unfortunately he was unable to see published. In one of them, Violence Origin(1993) he proposed new approach and discussed many issues particularly those of Fromm, Toynbee, and Young related to the matter. Violence Origin was sent to several institutions including to the United Nations Organization in New York but he never got any answer from UNO.

== Painting ==
Another tract of Santiago personality was that by influence of his wife Ariadne, who was an artist painter, he acquired a deep interest in the arts. This was also enhanced, because he for a time hosted in his home the famous painter Alberto da Veiga Guignard, who had a feeble healthy condition. Santiago became his voluntary private doctor. Guignard owes his life—and much of his present success to the dedicated Santiago Americano Freire, who nursed him back to health from a nearly fatal case of the diabetes failure. He also arranged that Guinard got a state pension of $100 a month; further Santiago provided most of his exhibitions. In one year alone Guignard sold more than 100 of his paintings.

As a result, Santiago became a painter himself. He was also a close friends of Brazilian artists such as Inimá de Paula. Thus Santiago left many pictures of his authorship some of which after his death went into auction.

In addition, he wrote a master piece “Harmonia cósmica na pintura de Leonardo (da Vinci), (Cosmic Harmony in the paintings of Leonardo), a well illustrated book also published, in 1965, by UFGM Printing House. This work was sent to most relevant libraries in Brazil and abroad. In this work, he maintains that Leonardo, before painting his pictures, used to draw a series of geometrical figures in order to get a harmonic balance between his work and the numbers that can be found in the geometry of the known universe of his epoch, that is the solar system.

Santiago found Leonardo’s pentagon structure whose circles on which the pentagon is supported obey a geometric progression which correspond to the orbits of planets of the Solar System. Santiago deduced the mathematical expression of that and the stereo perspective which he called the “Mathematics Philosophy in Leonardo’s work”. Thus “Santiago’s Leonardo” contributed with many other published works by many authors of different countries, to unveil the mysteries which involve the life of this great genius of the Renaissance period. Besides Santiago’s discoveries allowed him to transfer to his own canvas this cosmic harmony.

== Physics ==
Santiago also had a profound interest in Physics and Cosmology. He wrote in 1970 The quantic field structure theory, published, in 1970 by UFGM Printing House, where he deals with these complex matters.
