= André Rodrigues Durães =

Academic background
- Education: M.D. Ph.D.
- Alma mater: Federal University of Bahia; University of São Paulo

André Rodrigues Durães is a Brazilian physician and researcher whose work focuses on cardiology, intensive care medicine, and hospital management. He also is a professor of medicine at the Escola Bahiana de Medicina e Saúde Pública.

In 2019, Durães was elected a Fellow of the European Society of Cardiology (FESC). From 2021 to 2024, Durães was included in the annual Top 2% Scientists list. In 2024, he received the Tomé de Souza Medal from the City Council of Salvador.

As a researcher, Durães has authored more than 90 peer-reviewed scientific publications in international journals, with research focusing on heart failure, heart transplantation, anticoagulation, intensive care medicine, clinical epidemiology, and hospital management. According to his Google Scholar profile, as of June 2026, Durães had received 108,052 citations and had an h-index of 47.

== Selected publications ==
- Duraes, Andre Rodrigues; de Souza Lima Bitar, Yasmin; Schonhofen, Igor Santos; Travassos, Kethyren Santos Oliveira; Pereira, Larissa Vitória; Filho, Jose Admirço Lima; Neto, Mansueto Gomes; Junior, Roque Aras; Roever, Leonardo (2021-05-01). "Rivaroxaban Versus Warfarin in Patients with Mechanical Heart Valves: Open-Label, Proof-of-Concept trial—The RIWA study". American Journal of Cardiovascular Drugs. 21 (3): 363–371. doi:10.1007/s40256-020-00449-3. ISSN 1179-187X.
- Duraes, Andre Rodrigues; de Souza Lima Bitar, Yasmin; Roever, Leonardo; Neto, Mansueto Gomes (2020-09-01). "Endomyocardial fibrosis: past, present, and future". Heart Failure Reviews. 25 (5): 725–730. doi:10.1007/s10741-019-09848-4. ISSN 1573-7322.
- Durães, André R.; Bitar, Yasmin de S.L.; Lima, Maria Luiza G.; Santos, Caroline C.; Schonhofen, Igor S.; Filho, José Admirço L.; Roever, Leonardo (2018-09-15). "Usefulness and Safety of Rivaroxaban in Patients Following Isolated Mitral Valve Replacement With a Mechanical Prosthesis". The American Journal of Cardiology. 122 (6): 1047–1050. doi:10.1016/j.amjcard.2018.06.015. ISSN 0002-9149.
- Custodio, Joaquim Silva; Duraes, Andre Rodrigues; Abreu, Marconi; Albuquerque Rocha, Natalia; Roever, Leonardo (2018-05-01). "SGLT2 inhibition and heart failure—current concepts". Heart Failure Reviews. 23 (3): 409–418. doi:10.1007/s10741-018-9703-2. ISSN 1573-7322.
- Durães, André Rodrigues; de Souza Roriz, Pollianna; de Almeida Nunes, Bianca; Albuquerque, Felipe Pinho e.; de Bulhões, Fábio Vieira; de Souza Fernandes, Andre Mauricio; Aras, Roque (2016-06-01). "Dabigatran Versus Warfarin After Bioprosthesis Valve Replacement for the Management of Atrial Fibrillation Postoperatively: DAWA Pilot Study". Drugs in R&D. 16 (2): 149–154. doi:10.1007/s40268-016-0124-1. ISSN 1179-6901.
