= Carlos Rittl =

Brazilian scientist and environmentalist

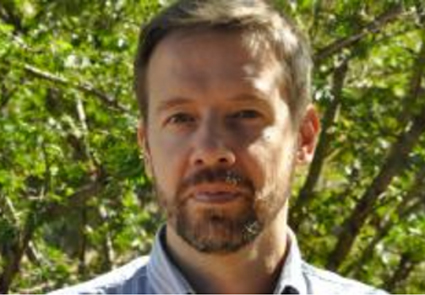
- Education: São Paulo School of Business Administration
- Occupations: scientist; environmentalist; Director of Public Policy, Wildlife Conservation Society

Carlos Rittl is a scientist and environmentalist from Brazil.

== Biography ==
=== Early life and education ===
Born in São Paulo, he graduated in Public Administration from the São Paulo School of Business Administration, but later decided to shift to natural sciences, earning a master's and PhD in Tropical Biology and Natural Resources at the National Institute for Amazonian Research.

=== Career ===
He is known for his work in environmental defense and public debates on global warming. He participated in the multilateral negotiations of the United Nations Framework Convention on Climate Change and the United Nations Conference on Sustainable Development. From 2005 to 2007, he was the Climate Campaign Coordinator for Greenpeace Brazil, and from 2009 to 2013, he led the Climate Change and Energy Program at the Brazilian branch of the World Wide Fund for Nature. He is a member of the board of directors of the Brazilian branch of the OSCIP Friends of the Earth, of the advisory board of the CASA Socio-Environmental Fund, and since 2013 has been the Executive Secretary of the Climate Observatory, a prominent network that brings together over 40 NGOs focused on environmental issues, participates in the Brazilian Forum on Climate Change and produces scientific documents, described by scientist Paulo Moutinho as "one of the few groups in Brazilian civil society with representativeness, plurality, and longevity in the climate change discussion”, and has received the Lide Environmental Award in the Climate Change category, offered by Lide — Business Leaders Group and Lide Sustainability.

He represented the Observatory at the VI World Environment Forum and at the National Commission for REDD+, and was one of the reviewers of the Ministry of the Environment's Biodiversity report and the Analysis of GHG Emissions Brazil (1970-2014) and Its Implications for Public Policies and Brazil's Contribution to the Paris Agreement (2016) report produced by the Observatory, and contributed to the Climate Change Performance Index 2016 report by Climate Action Network Europe.
