= Thaisa Storchi Bergmann =

Brazilian astrophysicist

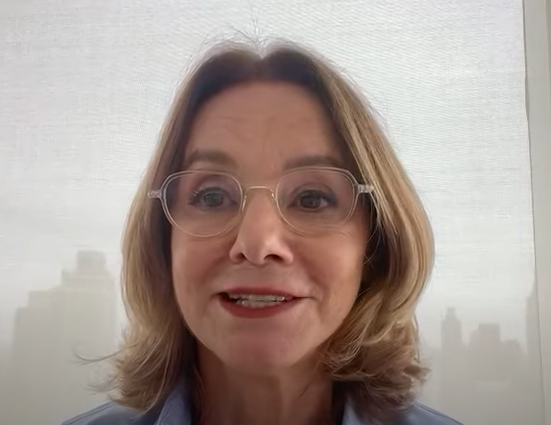
Thaisa Storchi Bergmann

Thaisa Storchi Bergmann (born 19 December 1955) is a Brazilian astrophysicist working at the Federal University of Rio Grande do Sul in Porto Alegre, Brazil. She won the Women in Science Award in 2015 for her work on supermassive black holes.

== Career ==
In 2004, along with Luis C. Ho and H. R. Schmitt, she edited the book The Interplay among Black Holes, Stars and ISM in Galactic Nuclei, proceedings of the 222nd Symposium of the International Astronomical Union.

In 2015, she received the L'Oréal-UNESCO Awards for Women in Science for the Latin America region. The award cited her "outstanding work on super-massive black holes in the centers of galaxies and their associated regions of dense gas, dust, and young stars surrounding them, as well as their role in the evolution of galaxies."

In 2018, she received the National Medal of Scientific Merit from the Brazilian government.

In 2018, she was nominated President of the Commission X1 of the International Astronomical Union, on Supermassive Black Holes, Feedback and Galaxy Evolution.
