= Oswaldo Cruz (disambiguation) =

Oswaldo Cruz (1872–1917) was a Brazilian physician, pioneer bacteriologist, epidemiologist and public health officer.

Oswaldo Cruz may also refer to:

- Oswaldo Cruz, Rio de Janeiro, neighborhood in Rio de Janeiro, Brazil
- Oswaldo Cruz Foundation, Brazilian institution for research and development in biological science
- Memórias do Instituto Oswaldo Cruz, peer-reviewed open access medical journal
- Rodovia Oswaldo Cruz, state highway in São Paulo, Brazil
- Taça Oswaldo Cruz, football tournament between Brazil and Paraguay
- Oswaldo Cruz Filho (1902-unknown), Brazilian chess player

== See also ==
- Osvaldo Cruz (disambiguation)
- Oswaldocruzia panamaensis, species of gastrointestinal nematode named after the Brazilian physician
