= Brazil–Ukraine relations =

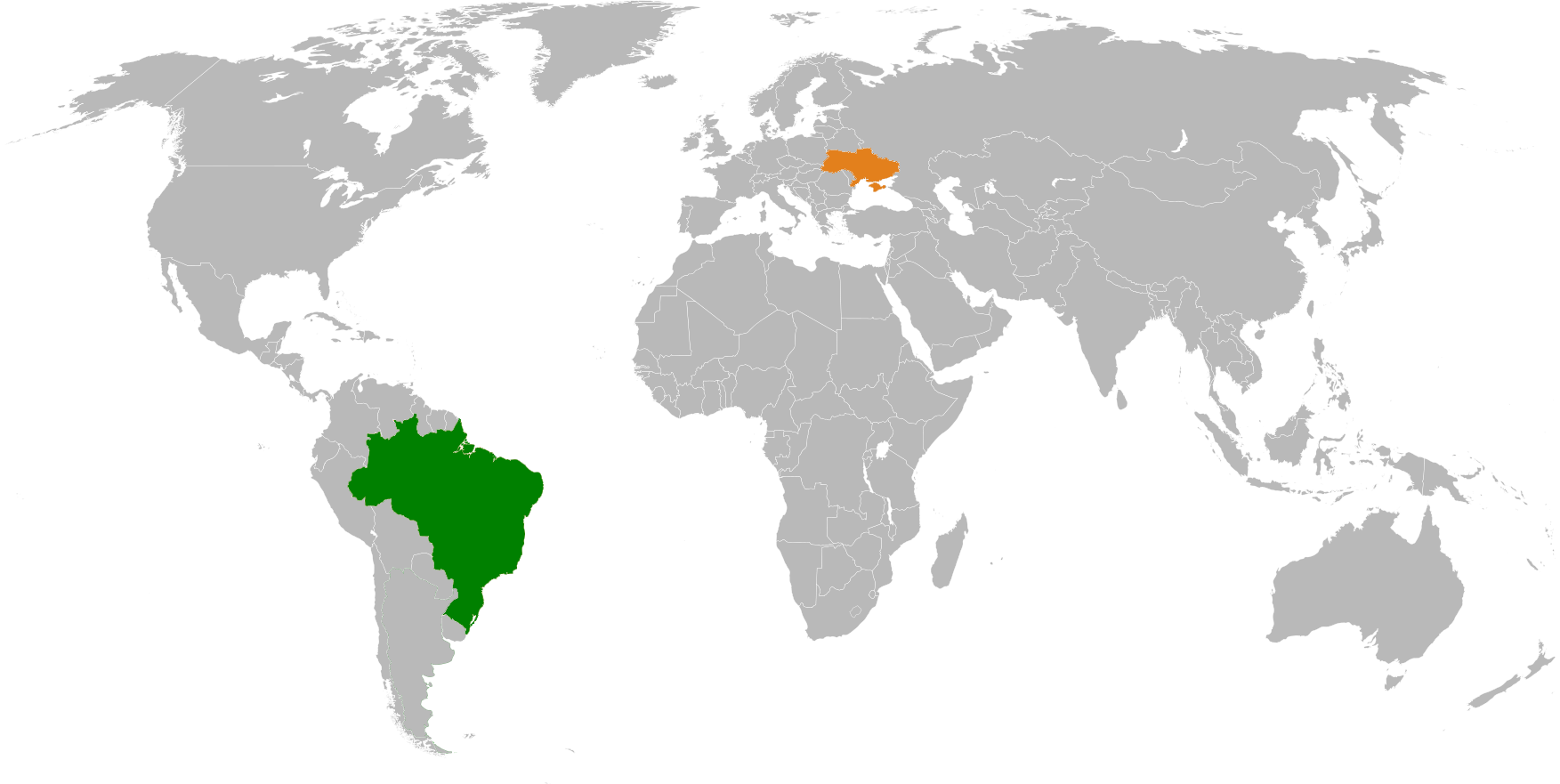
- Brazil: Ukraine

Brazil and Ukraine have a long-standing and highly diversified relationship that includes cooperation in trade, space technology, education, energy, healthcare, and defense, as well as historic people-to-people ties through a large Ukrainian diaspora in Brazil. Brazil recognized Ukraine's independence on December 26, 1991, and bilateral relations were established on February 11, 1992. In 2009, the two countries established a strategic partnership. Brazil is Ukraine's key trade partner in Latin America. The ongoing conflict has strained relations between the two countries, including Ukrainian objections to the Brazil-China 6 point peace plan, but bilateral meetings between the two governments increased in 2024.

Brazil has the third largest Ukrainian population outside of the former Soviet Union, with approximately 500,000 Ukrainian descendants.

== History ==
=== Prior to Ukrainian Independence ===
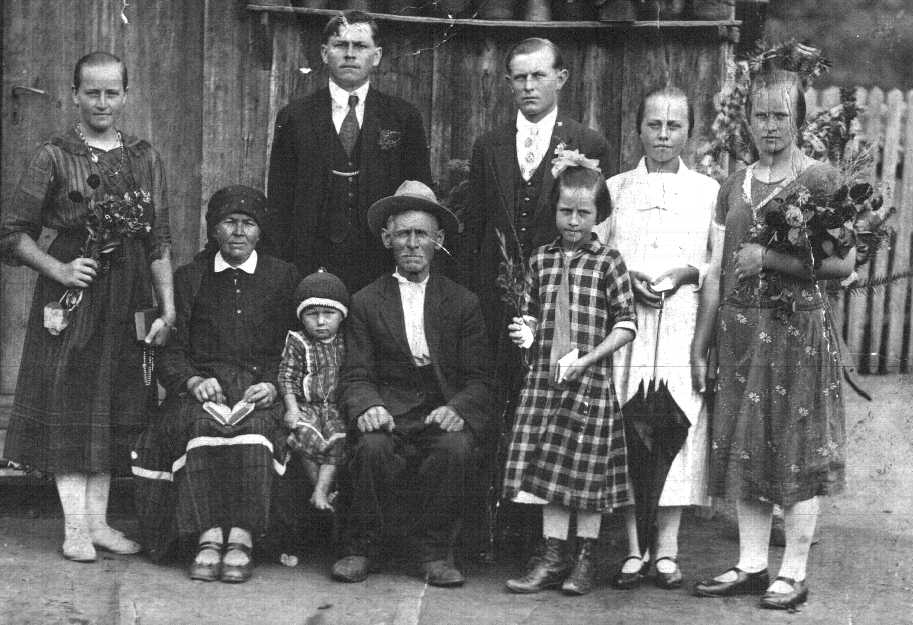
Ukrainian immigrants in Parana at the end of the 19th century

After Brazil abolished slavery in 1888, the country needed additional labor to maintain its coffee and rubber production. The Brazilian government and private actors sponsored agents to travel across Europe to recruit migrants, resulting in a wave of Ukrainian immigrants from 1895-1897 known as the “Brazilian Fever.” These early Ukrainian immigrants mainly settled in Paraná state and established wheat, rye, coffee, black bean, and mint farms.

Two additional notable waves of Ukrainian immigrants arrived in Brazil. Between 1907 and 1914, Ukrainians were recruited as laborers to construct Brazil’s railroads. A final wave of more highly educated Ukrainians arrived between 1947 and 1951 fleeing the instability of World War II and soviet persecution.

=== Ukrainian Independence to 2014 ===
Brazil recognized Ukraine's independence on December 26, 1991. Bilateral relations were established two months later on February 11, 1992 and high level dialogue would begin in October 1995, when President Leonid Kuchma made the first official visit of a President of Ukraine to Brazil. The visit resulted in the Economic-Commercial Cooperation Agreement, which provided for the formation of the Brazil-Ukraine Intergovernmental Cooperation Commission. During that visit, Kuchma also proposed that both countries could cooperate in the aerospace sector. Ukraine could supply Brazil with advanced missile technology while Brazil offered a cheap launch site for rocket tests. President Fernando Henrique Cardoso repaid the visit in January 2002, becoming the first Brazilian President to visit Ukraine.

Bilateral contacts significantly increased after the inauguration of President Luiz Inácio Lula da Silva of Brazil. In September 2003, the presidents of Ukraine and Brazil met in New York, during the 58th session of the United Nations General Assembly. The state-level dialogue continued with the official visits of the President of Ukraine to Brazil in October 2003, and of the President of Brazil to Ukraine in 2004. Bilateral dialogue at the highest level was again pursued in September 2005 within the framework of participation of the Presidents of Ukraine and Brazil in the activities of 60th session of the United Nations General Assembly.

In November 2008, the Secretary of Strategic Affairs of the Presidency of Brazil, Roberto Mangabeira Unger, made an important visit to Ukraine where he met with the Secretary of the National Security and Defense Council of Ukraine, Ms. Raissa Bogatyriova, and the heads of the Ministries of Foreign Affairs, Defense, and Industrial Policy of Ukraine. The visit paved way for the signing of several important bilateral agreements in the fields of defense and space technology.

A major boost to the development of bilateral cooperation was the meeting of the Ukrainian President Viktor Yushchenko and Brazilian President Lula within the 64th session of the United Nations General Assembly in New York on September 22, 2009. During this meeting, both presidents agreed to establish working groups in order to prepare for the visit of President Lula da Silva to Ukraine, which was successfully held in December 2009. This visit marked an important step in the strengthening of bilateral relations – it established the strategic partnership between the two countries. Agreements in the fields of aircraft manufacturing, defense, technology, space exploration and nuclear energy, followed.

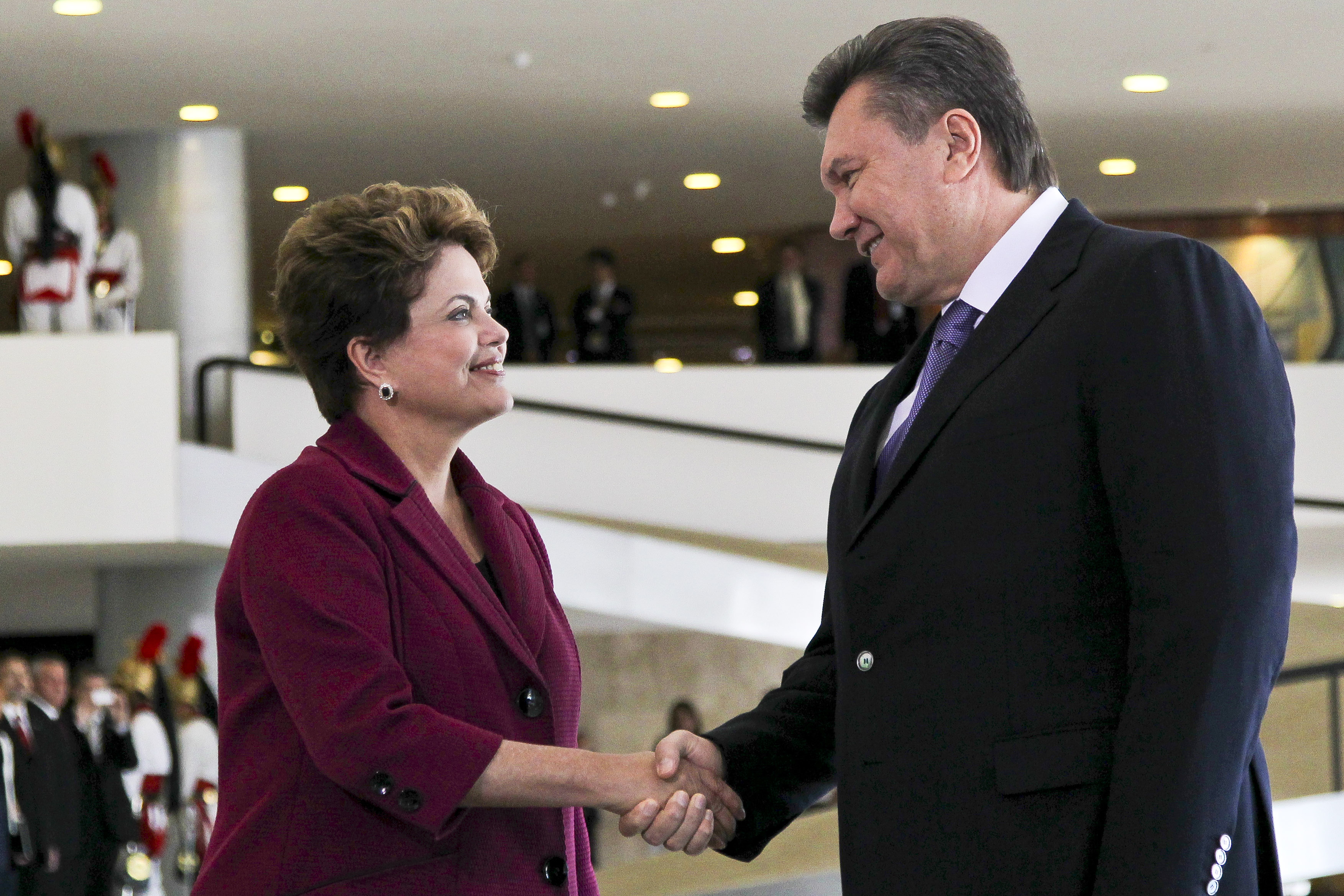
President Dilma Rousseff during the official arrival ceremony of the President of Ukraine, Viktor Yanukovitch, in 2011

In April 2011, Ukrainian Prime Minister Mykola Azarov met with the President of Brazil, Dilma Rousseff, in Sanya. The two discussed a wide range of topics on the bilateral agenda, in particular the progress of the Ukrainian-Brazilian space project "Alcântara Cyclone Space". Mykola Azarov and Dilma Rousseff also talked about the 120th anniversary of the Ukrainian immigration to Brazil.

Ukrainian President Viktor Yanukovych made a state visit to Brazil on October 25, 2011. During the occasion, the Ukrainian and Brazilian governments issued a joint statement outlining areas of cooperation for the subsequent years, with the aim of further elevating the bilateral partnership.

Bilateral relations weakened in 2013 due to political and economic challenges during the “Euromaidan” protests in Ukraine and the Russian invasion of the Ukrainian peninsula of Crimea in 2014.

=== Impact of 2014 Russian Invasion of Crimea on Brazil-Ukraine Relations ===
When Russia invaded Crimea in 2014, the Brazilian Foreign Minister Antonio Patriota described his country’s position as stressing the need for dialogue and moderation to achieve a peaceful solution respecting human rights and democratic institutions. Brazil abstained on US-led UNGA Resolution 68/262 which condemned the invasion of Crimea, arguing that the resolution violated the principle of popular consultation. At the 2014 BRICS Summit, Brazil and the other BRICS members signed a declaration that did not condemn Russia and merely called for an end to sanctions and a peaceful conclusion.

Ukrainian members of parliament visited Brazil in 2015, 2016 and 2017, and the two parliaments formed correlating parliamentary friendship groups in 2019 to support intergovernmental cooperation. The Brazilian Chamber of Deputies adopted a statement in support of Ukraine after Russia claimed to have held local elections in Crimea and Sevastopol in September 2019.

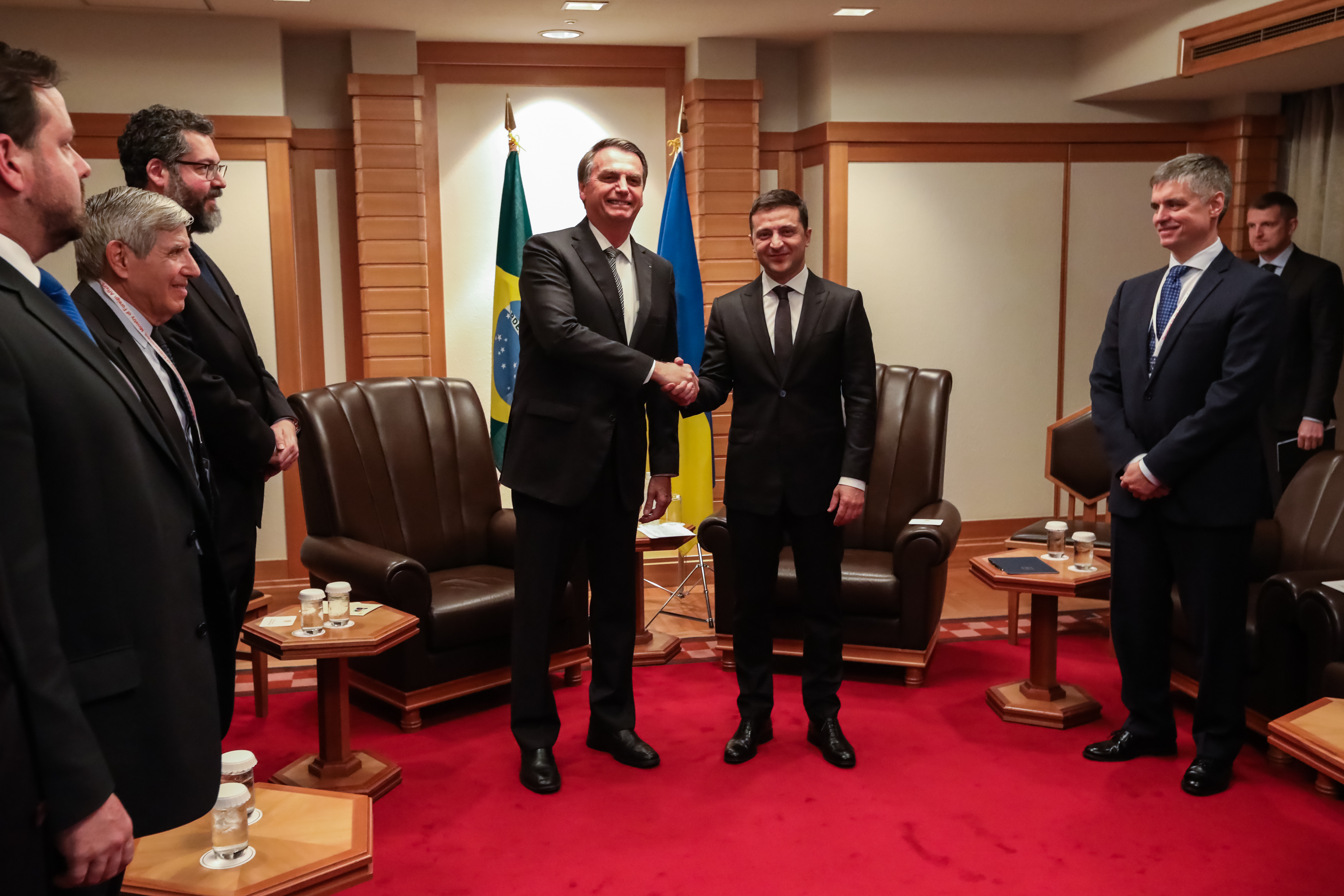
Bolsonaro and Zelenskyy meet in Japan in 2019

Brazilian president Jair Bolsonaro and Ukrainian President Volodymyr Zelenskyy met in 2019 on the sidelines of Bolsonaro's trip to Japan, with the presidents expressed a shared priority of expanding the trade between the two countries.

Amidst escalating tensions in the Kerch Strait, Brazil was the only South American country to call for a peaceful solution to the crisis. This period led to an increase of cooperation between the two nations in defense and military cooperation. First, the two nations met in a virtual defense cooperation conference in September 2020. The conference was followed by the first Defense Industry Dialogue in Kyiv in December 2020 with the prime minister of Ukraine and high-ranking officials from Brazil, resulting in two Memorandums of Understanding on defense-related cooperation. The following March, the two nations held interagency consultations between Ukraine and Brazil in the field of cybersecurity. In 2021, Eduard Bolsonaro (son of then-president Jair Bolsonaro and Chairman of the Committee on International Relations and National Security of the Chamber of Deputies) visited Ukraine to meet with representatives of weapons manufacturers on behalf of the Brazilian army.

=== Relations after the 2022 Russian Invasion ===
President Bolsonaro attended an official state visit with Vladimir Putin in Russia just before the 2022 invasion of Ukraine. Journalists reported that the Brazilian government chose not to implement plans to evacuate around 500 Brazilians living in Ukraine ahead of the war so as to not upset Russia during the visit. After the invasion, a few Brazilian citizens living in Europe drove to Ukraine in an attempt to evacuate fellow Brazilians trapped by the conflict.

On 27 February 2022, during the Russian invasion of Ukraine, Brazilian President Bolsonaro criticized Ukrainian President Zelenskyy and stated that Brazil would "adopt a neutral stance on Ukraine," would not impose sanctions on Russia, and that Ukrainians had "trusted a comedian with the fate of a nation." However days after the invasion, Bolsonaro emphasized Brazil’s neutrality, saying, “We want peace, but we don’t want to bring consequences for Brazil.”

Brazil, as the non-permanent chair of the UN Security Council in 2022, stressed their responsibility in the council and the general assembly to reverse the escalation, but also abstained from a resolution to suspend Russia from the UN Human Rights Council. On 2 March, Brazil approved of UN General assembly resolution ES-11/1 demanding a full withdrawal of Russian forces. Brazil also supported a series of other resolutions condemning Russian aggression, but also abstained from proposals that offered tangible support to Ukraine.

President Bolsonaro lost the 2022 Brazilian general election to Luiz Inácio Lula da Silva, who repeatedly attacked NATO and the European Union as the cause of Russia's invasion of Ukraine, accusing NATO of "claiming for itself the right to install military bases in the vicinity of another country". He criticized Western leaders for "encouraging war instead of focusing on closed-door negotiations" and having "failed to do enough to negotiate with Russia", while also blaming Ukrainian president Volodymyr Zelenskyy of being "as responsible as Putin for the war". Later in April 2023, Lula suggested that Ukraine should "give up Crimea" to end the war, saying Zelenskyy "can not want everything".

In May 2023 Brazil denied a request from the Ukrainian government for the purchase of 450 VBTP-MR Guarani armored vehicles in their ambulance configuration, in spite of Ukraine offering assurances that the vehicles would only be used for humanitarian purposes such as evacuating civilians and transferring wounded personnel.

However, some Brazilian politicians remained deeply concerned about Ukraine, and Brazilian parliamentarians formed the Brazil-Ukraine Parliamentary Group on May 30, 2023, led by Senator Flávio Arns.

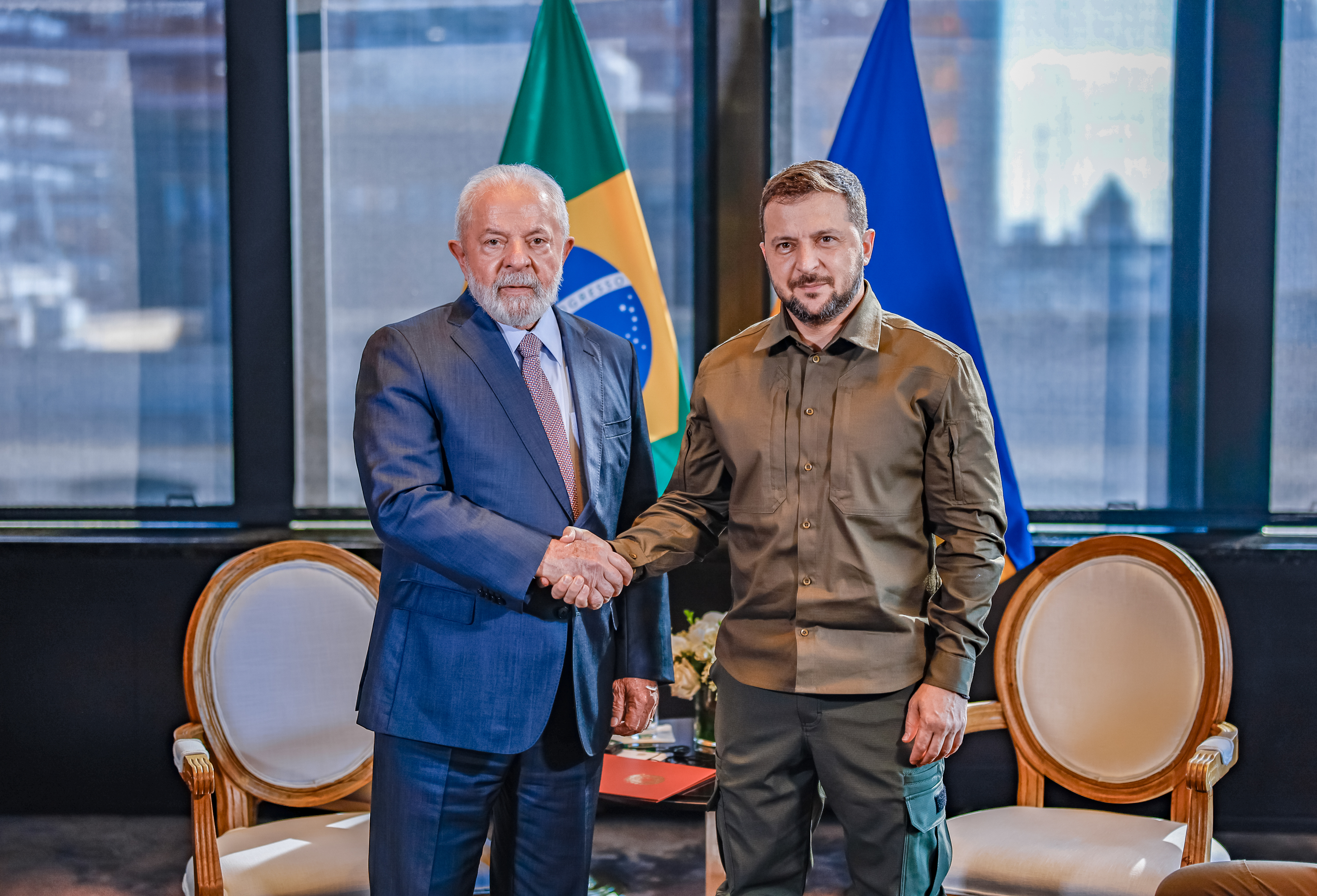
Lula and Zelenskyy meeting in 2023

Lula also sought to use the war to reaffirm Brazil’s role in international politics. Lula proposed that Brazil create a “peace club” including Russia, Ukraine, and a number of other mediating members, but the proposal found little support from either side. In September 2023, Lula met with Zelenskyy in New York City to discuss the future of the war and improve relations between the two countries.

Brazil was an observer at the Summit on Peace in Ukraine, hosted in Switzerland in June 2024, but did not sign the joint communique because Russia was not represented at the summit.

In May 2024, the Brazilian and Chinese governments jointly proposed a six-point peace plan:

1. Non-escalation or provocations by either side.
2. An international peace conference accepted by both Russia and Ukraine, which includes a "fair discussion" of all peace plans.
3. An increase of humanitarian assistance to "prevent a humanitarian crisis on a larger scale," as well as an exchange of prisoners of war, and no attacks on civilians.
4. All possible efforts must be made to "prevent nuclear proliferation and avoid nuclear crisis."
5. Attacks on nuclear power plants and other peaceful nuclear facilities "must be opposed."
6. Enhanced international cooperation on several issues in order to "protect the stability of global industrial and supply chains."

Zelenskyy initially expressed doubt in the plan, saying the proposal only served Russian interests. However, Ukrainian officials later indicated that the government was willing to listen to proposals and potentially integrate some elements into its own peace formula.

In June 2024, Ukrainian Deputy Minister of Foreign Affairs Iryna Borovets visited Brazil to discuss the upcoming Global Peace Summit in Switzerland, supporting interparliamentary cooperation, and increasing bilateral cooperation in agriculture, trade, and defense. In August 2024, the first parliamentary delegation from Brazil to visit Ukraine in 13 years for meetings with the Ukrainian Presidential Office, the Energy Ministry, and Ukrainian members of parliament.

== Economic relations ==
The total flow of trade between the two countries peaked at over $1 billion from 2011-2012, but fell after the Russian invasion of the Ukrainian peninsula of Crimea in 2014 and has been slow to recover. In 2022, Brazil exported $173 million to Ukraine, mainly special purpose motor vehicles ($28.5M), liquid dispersing machines ($26.2M), and ground nuts ($9.76M), whereas Ukraine exported $41.7 million, mainly electric heaters ($10.8M), vaccines, blood, antisera, toxins and cultures ($7.94M), and packaged medicaments ($6.71M).

=== Trade ===
	2004	2006	2008	2010	2012	2014	2016	2018	2020	2022
(Ukraine) Ukrainian exports to Brazil	$206 million	$148 million	$375 million	$395 million	$375 million	$137 million	$34 million	$62.4 million	$85.2 million	$47.1 million
(Brazil) Brazilian exports to Ukraine	$266 million	$257 million	$604 million	$346 million	$692 million	$192 million	$148 million	$184 million	$215 million	$173 million
Total trade	$472 million	$405 million	$979 million	$741 million	$1.1 billion	$329 million	$182 million	$246 million	$300 million	$220 million
Note: All values are in U.S. dollars. Source: OEC

=== Economic cooperation ===
In 1995, the governments of Brazil and Ukraine signed the Economic-Commercial Cooperation Agreement, which created the Brazil-Ukraine Intergovernmental Cooperation Commission (ICC). The ICC met at least six times between 2001 and 2013, discussing collaboration on education, energy, space technology, agriculture, health and infrastructure. The commission was still operating as of 2021.

In April 2024, the Vice President of Brazil Geraldo Alckmin and the Ukrainian Minister of Economy Yuliia Svyrydenko agreed that their governments would cooperate to increase trade.

=== Science and technology ===
In April 2009, the governments of Brazil and Ukraine ratified an agreement between the Cabinet of Ministers of Ukraine and the Government of the Federal Republic of Brazil on Scientific and Technical Cooperation. In addition to the space cooperation described below, another important example of cooperation in the areas of science and technology is the Ukrainian state-owned enterprise Indar and the Brazilian state-owned pharmaceutical company FioCruz (Rio de Janeiro) collaborating to establish insulin production in Brazil using Ukrainian technologies.

=== Space cooperation ===
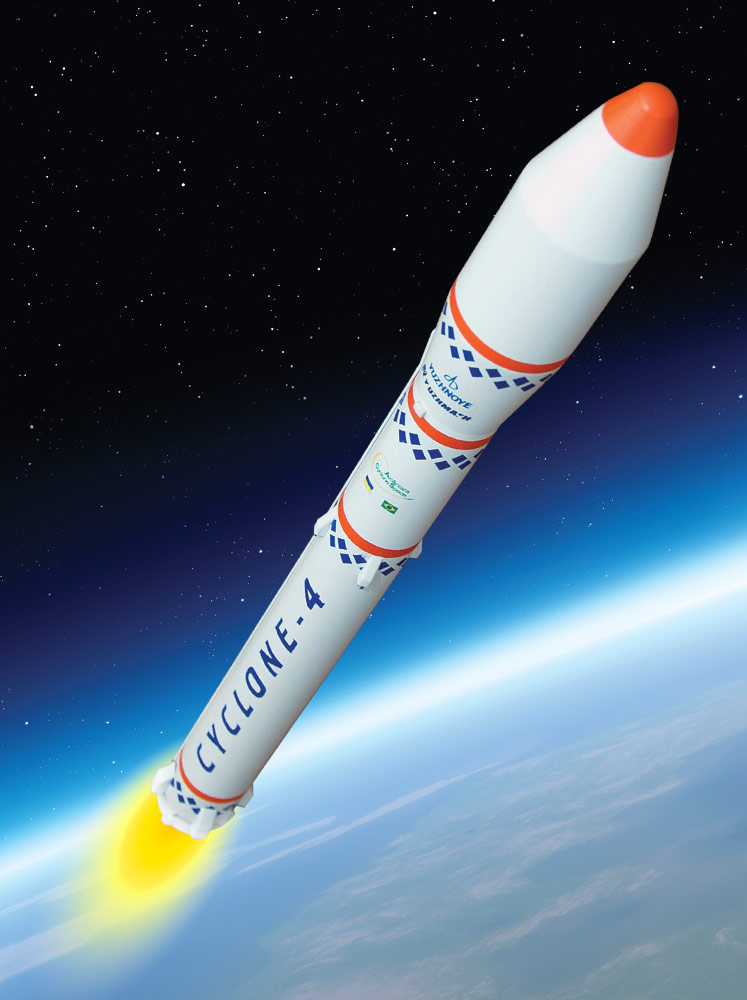
The Cyclone-4 rocket being developed by Ukraine

In October 2003, the Brazilian Minister of Science and Technology and the Ukrainian Minister of Foreign Affairs signed the “Treaty of Long-Term Cooperation on the Use of Launching Vehicle Cyclone-4.” The agreement created a binational joint venture company based in Brasilia, Alcantara Cyclone Space, in an effort to launch Ukraine’s Cyclone-4 rocket from Brazil’s Alcantara Launch Center in Maranhao. Concurrently, the Brazilian Space Agency and the National Space Agency of the Ukraine signed a Memorandum of Understanding (MOU) on Future Bilateral Projects.

The project faced challenges, such as technical complications, regulatory hurdles, pushback from the U.S. State Department that caused the private companies Fiat Avio and Motorola to pull out of the project, and political instability after the Russian invasion of Crimea in 2014. Russia also quietly pressured Brazil to abandon the agreement. Ultimately, the deputy chief of the Brazilian Space Agency announced the end of the project in April 2015 due to concerns about cost and financial viability. Combined, the two governments spent approximately R$1 billion (US$328 million) in the failed venture.

== Cultural relations ==
An important foundation of cultural relations between the two countries is the large population of Ukrainian descent in Brazil. The embassies of the two countries seek to promote cultural exchange through music, films, and literature.

=== Ukrainian Brazilians ===
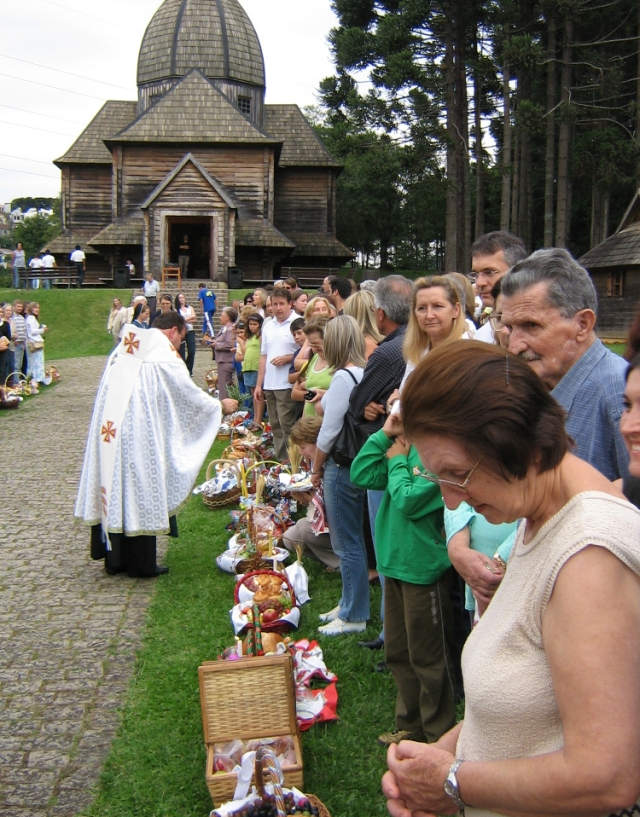
Ukrainian Brazilians celebrate Ukrainian Easter in Parana State

Estimates suggest there are roughly 500,000 people of Ukrainian descent living in Brazil today. The Ukrainian Brazilian population is mostly centered in the state of Paraná, particularly in the city of Prudentópolis, where 75% of the population is of Ukrainian descent and Ukrainian is an official language. The majority of this population follows the Ukrainian Greek Catholic Church, which has helped preserve Ukrainian culture in Brazil.

=== Visas and tourism ===
The first mutual visa agreement between the governments of Brazil and Ukraine entered into force on October 24, 1996 to permit citizens to travel between the two nations more freely. Today, travel between the two countries is facilitated by the Visa Waiver Agreement signed in 2009 by the Brazilian and Ukrainian governments, which came into force on December 30, 2011. With this measure, Ukrainian citizens can stay in Brazil as tourists for up to 90 days, during a period of 180 days, without the need for a visa. Under the principle of reciprocity, Brazilian citizens can also stay in Ukraine as tourists for up to 90 days, during a period of 180 days, without the need for a visa.

Since March 2022, the Brazilian Government has granted a temporary visa and residence permit for humanitarian reception purposes to Ukrainian nationals and stateless persons who have been affected or displaced by the Russian invasion of Ukraine. The program has been extended repeatedly, most recently until December 31, 2025. Other Brazilian initiatives include welcoming Ukrainian scientists and professors fleeing violence at the universities in Paraná state.

== Resident diplomatic missions ==
Of Brazil

- Kyiv (Embassy)

Of Ukraine

- Brasília (Embassy)

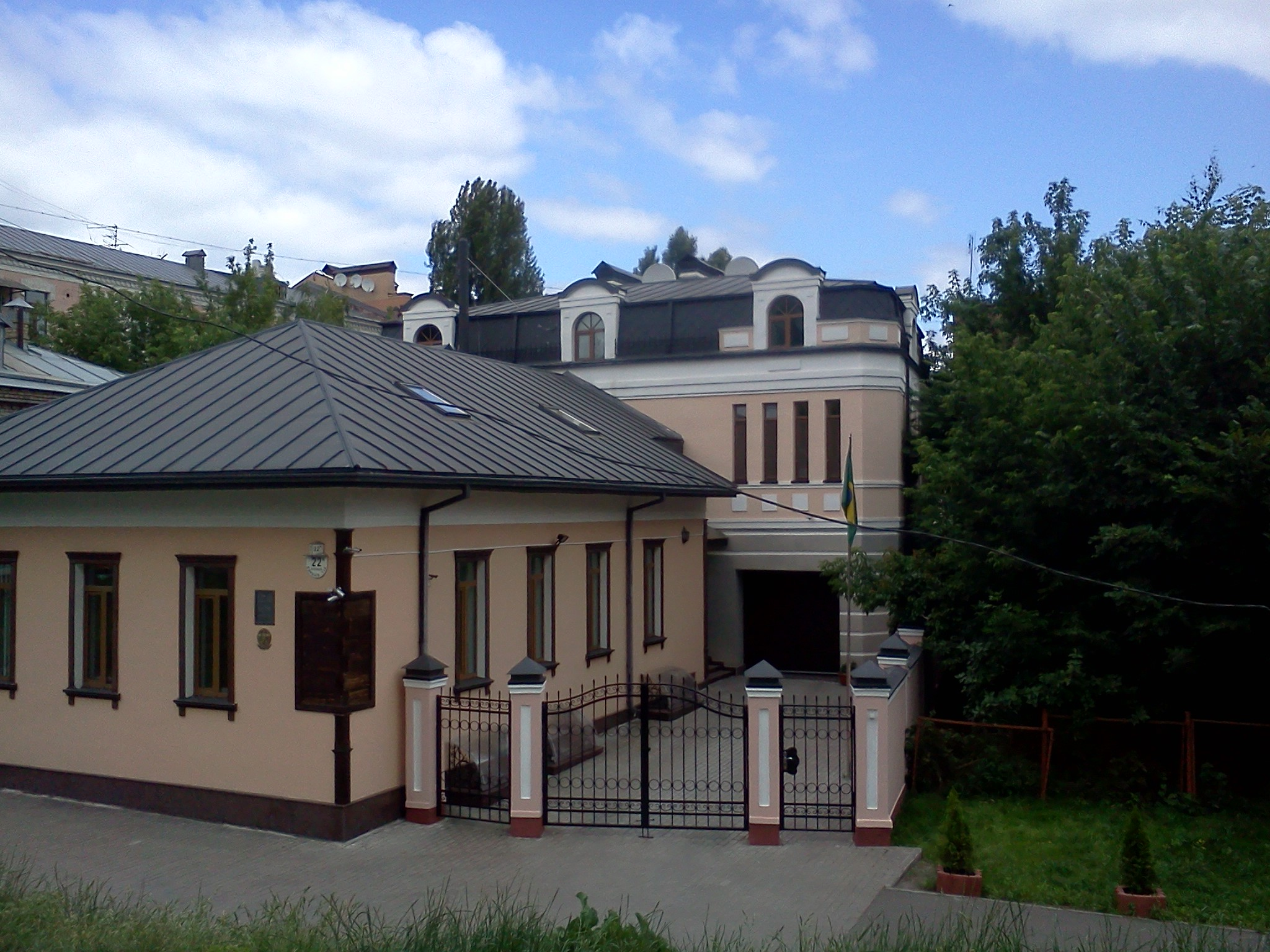
Embassy of Brazil in Kyiv

== Diplomacy ==
Ukraine established an embassy in Brasilia in 1993. In addition, Ukraine maintains three honorary consulates in Blumenau, Paranaguá, and São Paulo. Brazil established an embassy in Kyiv in 1995, and maintains three honorary consulates in Kharkiv, Dnipro, and Lviv.

=== Ambassadors ===
==== Ukrainian Ambassadors to Brazil ====
- Oleksandr Nikonenko (1996-2000)
- Yuriy Bohayevskyi (2000-2006)
- Vladimir Lakomov (2007-2010)
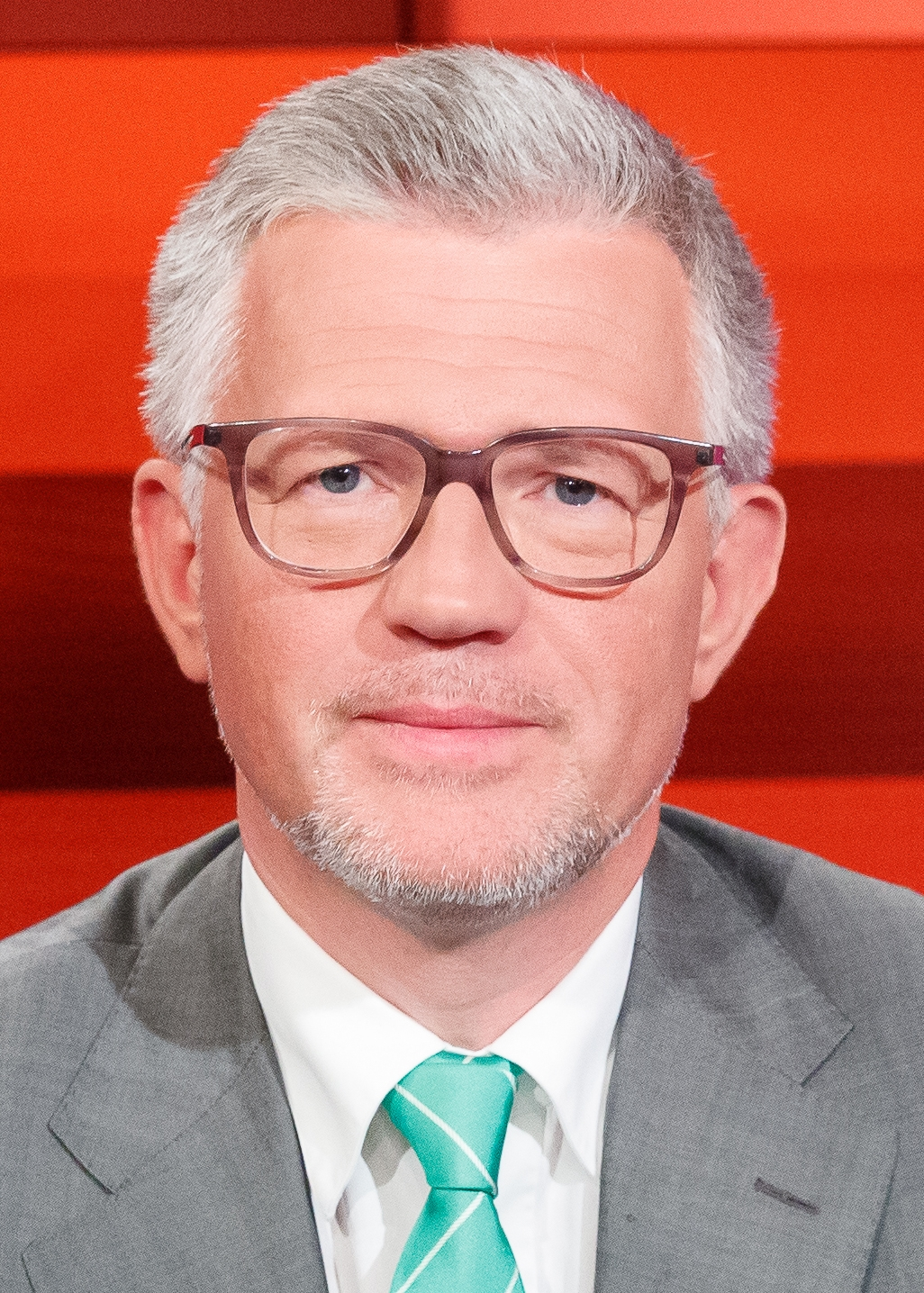
  Ukrainian Ambassador Andrii Melnyk
- Ihor Hrushko (2010-2012)
- Rostyslav Tronenko (2012-2021)
- Andrii Melnyk (2023–present)

==== Brazilian Ambassadors to Ukraine ====
- Asdrúbal Pinto de Ulysséa (1994-1998)
- Mário Augusto Santos (1998-2001)
- Hélder Martins de Moraes (2001-2003)
- Renato Luiz Rodrigues Marques (2003-2009)
- Antônio Fernando Cruz de Mello (2009-2016)
- Oswaldo Biato Júnior (2016-2020)
- Norton de Andrade Mello Rapesta (2020-2024)
- Rafael de Mello Vidal (2024–present)

== See also ==
- Ukrainian Brazilians
