= Evandro Chagas Institute =

Non-profit organization

The Evandro Chagas Institute (Portuguese Instituto Evandro Chagas, or IEC) is a non-profit organization which promotes public health in Brazil named after Evandro Chagas.

== History ==
In the 1940s fisherman Henrique Penna from the Rockefeller Foundation in Rio de Janeiro reported that he had discovered cases of leishmaniasis in Brazil's countryside. The disease had not been previously detected in Brazil, and as a response, Carlos Chagas of the Oswaldo Cruz Institute organized a commission leishmaniasis to be headed by his son Evandro Chagas.

In 1938 this commission became the Instituto de Pathologia Experimental do Norte, or Northern Institution for Experimental Pathology (IPEN), with a mission to study leishmaniasis and other regional diseases. In 1940 Evandro Chagas died in a plane crash. To acknowledge his work as a scientist, the government changed the name of the former IPEN into the Evandro Chagas Institute.

== Research ==
The IEC organized local volunteers to participate in the iPrEx study, which was a clinical trial testing the efficacy of a drug used as a pre-exposure prophylaxis against HIV infection.
