= Carlos Chagas =

Brazilian doctor and scientist (1879–1934)

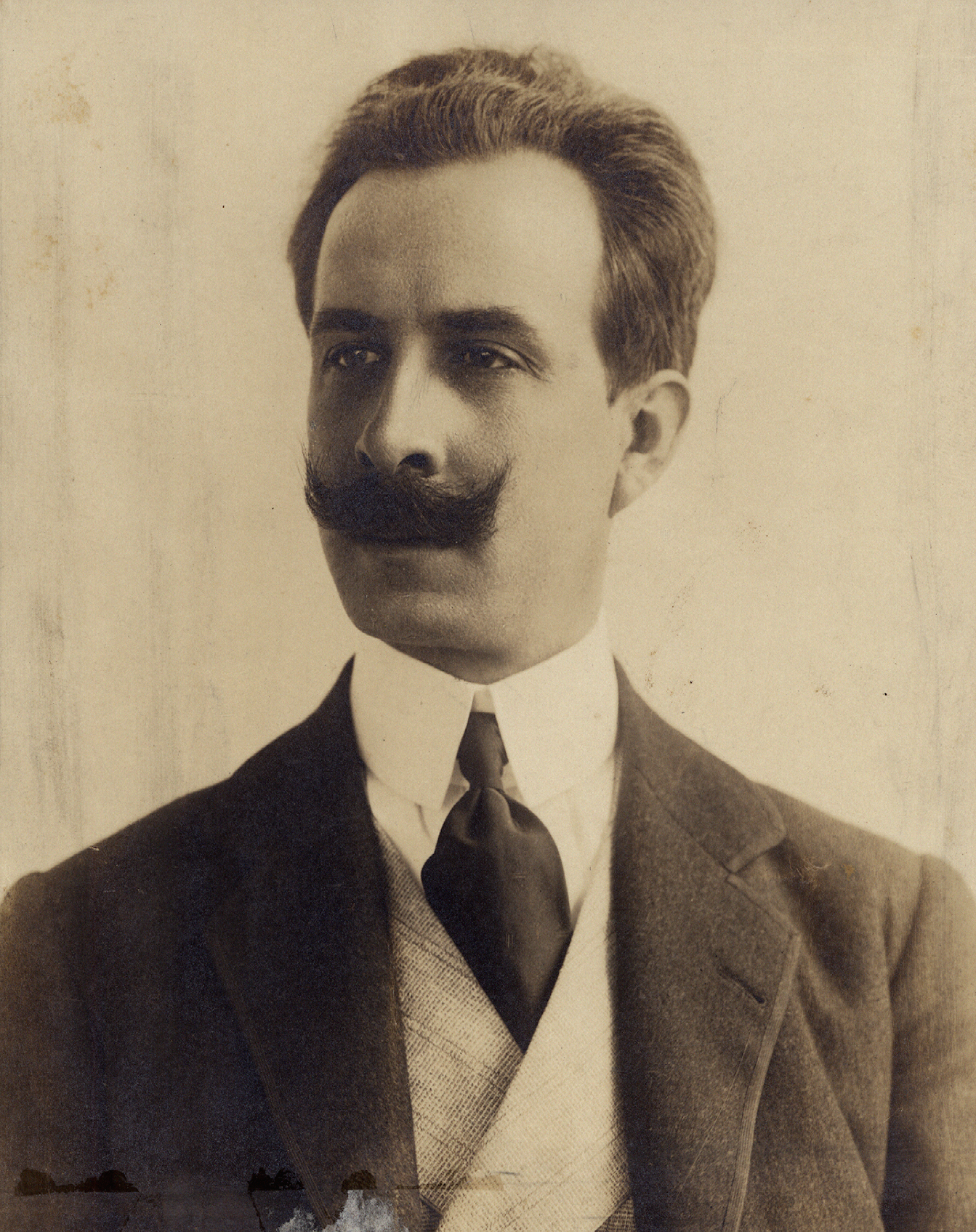
- Born: 9 July 1879; Oliveira, Minas Gerais, Empire of Brazil
- Died: 8 November 1934 (aged 55); Rio de Janeiro, United States of Brazil
- Education: Medical School of Rio de Janeiro
- Known for: Chagas disease
- Parents: José Justiniano das Chagas (father); Mariana Cândida Chagas (mother)
- Awards: Knight of the Order of the Crown of Italy (1920); Commander of the Order of the Crown of Belgium (1923); Knight of the Legion of Honour (1923); Officer of the Order of St. James of the Sword (1924); Commander of the Order of Alfonso XII (1925); Commander of the Order of Isabella the Catholic (1926); Knight of the Order of the Crown of Romania (1929)
- Scientific career
- Fields: Microbiology; Medicine
- Workplaces: Instituto Oswaldo Cruz
- Thesis: Estudos hematológicos no impaludismo (1903)
- Doctoral advisor: Francisco Fajardo

Carlos Justiniano Ribeiro Chagas (Portuguese: [ˈkaʁluz ʒustʃĩniˈɐ̃nu ʁiˈbejɾu ˈʃaɡɐs]; 9 July 1879 – 8 November 1934), was a Brazilian sanitary physician, scientist, and microbiologist who worked as a clinician and researcher. Best known for the discovery of an eponymous protozoal infection called Chagas disease, also called American trypanosomiasis, he also discovered the causative fungi of the pneumocystis pneumonia. He described the two pathogens in 1909, while he was working at the Oswaldo Cruz Institute in Rio de Janeiro, and named the former Trypanosoma cruzi to honour his friend Oswaldo Cruz.

Chagas's work holds a unique place in the history of medicine, Chagas described in detail a previously-unknown infectious disease, its pathogen, vector (Triatominae), host, clinical manifestations, and epidemiology. Chagas was also the first to discover and illustrate the parasitic fungal genus Pneumocystis, which later became infamous for being linked to pneumocystis pneumonia in AIDS patients.

== Early life and education ==
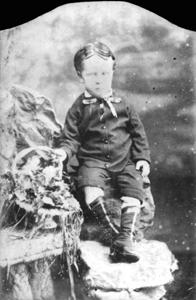
Carlos Chagas, age 4

Chagas was the son of José Justiniano das Chagas, a coffee farmer at Juiz de Fora in Minas Gerais, and Mariana Cândida Chagas (née Ribeiro de Castro), both of Portuguese descent. His birth place is also recorded as Oliveira, his mother's hometown, where the family spent half of their times. He was the eldest of four children, and his father died when he was four years old. At age seven, his mother enrolled him to Jesuit boarding school in São Paulo. In 1888, a political turmoil erupted as Emperor Dom Pedro II declared abolition of slavery. Chagas was compelled to leave the school. His mother then transferred him to a nearer Catholic school called San Antonio, where he completed up to his secondary studies.

Chagas entered the School of Mining Engineering at Ouro Preto, but suffered from beri-beri in 1895 that incapacitated him from continuing those studies. While recovering in Oliveira, his uncle Carlos Ribeiro de Castro, an established physician, persuaded him to take up medicine. In 1896, he joined the Medical School of Rio de Janeiro (now the Federal University of Rio de Janeiro). For his dissertation, his mentor, Francisco Fajardo, suggested that he work on malaria, as the process of its transmission had been discovered by a British medical officer Ronald Ross in India in 1898.

For the dissertation research, Fajardo introduced Chagas to Oswaldo Cruz (1872–1917) founder of the Manguinhos Institute (which was later renamed after Cruz) who would be most suitable to guide him. This led to a lasting friendship between Chagas and Cruz, and Chagas's lifelong association with Cruz's institute. He graduated in 1902 with a dissertation on malaria and earned his doctorate the following year with a thesis on Estudos Hematológicos do Impaludismo (Hematological Studies on Malaria).

== Early career ==
After a brief stint as a medical practitioner in the hinterlands, Chagas accepted a position in anti-malarial campaigns. In 1905, he worked under the Docas de Santos company in the port authority of Santos, São Paulo, with the mission of fighting the malaria epidemic, which was affecting its workers. With successful malaria prevention, the company was able to complete construction on the port. There, he introduced an innovation, which consisted in using pyrethrum, an insecticide, to treat households, with surprising success. His published work on this method served as the basis of prevention of malaria all over the world, and was adopted by a service of the Ministry of Health in Brazil, which was established expressly for this purpose.

In 1906, Chagas returned to Rio de Janeiro and joined the Oswaldo Cruz Institute, where he worked for the rest of his life. In 1907, there was an outbreak of malaria at the Minas Gerais hinterland, largely affecting railroad workers and greatly hampered the construction on new railway from Rio de Janeiro to the city of Belém in the Amazon. The Brazilian government asked Cruz for help. Cruz immediately assigned Chagas, with an assistant, Belisario Penna, to make the investigation. Camping at Lassance, a small town near the São Francisco River, Chagas stayed there for two years and was able to contain the infection after a year of work.

== Major discoveries ==
=== Chagas disease ===
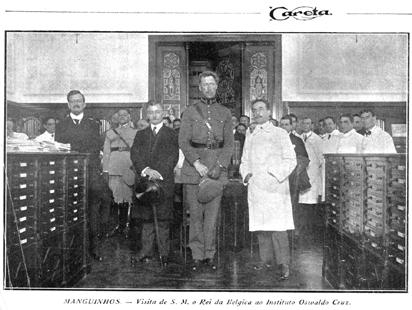
Carlos Chagas receiving President Epitácio Pessoa and King Albert I of Belgium at the Oswaldo Cruz Foundation in 1920

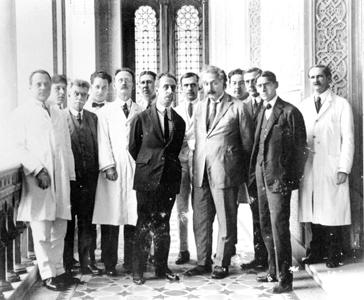
Carlos Chagas and Oswaldo Cruz Institute team receiving Albert Einstein in 1925

During his investigation of malaria in Lassance, Chagas observed the peculiar infestation of the rural houses with a large hematophagous insect of the genus Triatoma, a kind of "assassin bug" or "kissing bug" (barbeiro, "barber" in Portuguese, so-called because it sucked the blood at night by biting the faces of its victims). In his "Historic Restrospect", Chagas described:

On a journey to Pirapora and while spending the night in an engineers' camp Dr. Belisario Penna and I first made the acquaintance of the barbeiro, shown to us by Dr. Cantarino Motta, chief of the engineering committee. Once we heard of the blood-sucking habits of this insect and of its proliferation in human dwelling-places, we became very interested in knowing its exact biology and above all in ascertaining if by any chance it were, as I immediately supposed, a transmitter of any parasite of man or of another vertebrate.

He discovered that the intestines of these insects harbored flagellate protozoans, a new species of the genus Trypanosoma, and was able to prove experimentally that it could be transmitted to marmoset monkeys that were bitten by the infected bug. Chagas named this new parasite Trypanosoma cruzi in honor of Oswaldo Cruz and later that year as Schizotrypanum cruzi, and then once again as Trypanosoma cruzi.

Chagas's initial suspicion that the parasite could infect human and other vertebrates was proven right: he soon found the parasites in the blood of a cat. He then looked for a girl, later identified as Berenice Soares de Moura, a two-year-old girl whom he had seen in the same hut where that cat had been a few weeks before. He took Berenice's blood samples on 14 April 1909, discovering for the first time the same Trypanosoma parasite in the human blood. He also observed parasitic inclusions in the brain and myocardium, which would explain some of the clinical manifestations in diseased people, and closed the proposed lifecycle of the parasite by suggesting that the armadillo could be its natural reservoir. To complete his work on the pathology of the new disease, Chagas described 27 cases of the acute form of the disease and performed more than 100 autopsies on patients who exhibited the chronic form.

Chagas's description of the new disease was to become a classic in medicine, and brought him domestic and international distinction. He also persuaded Argentine physician Salvador Mazza to research the epidemic, leading to the latter's confirmation of the existence of Trypanosoma cruzi in Argentina in 1927, and eventually to government action.

==== Chagas heart disease ====
Upon discovering Trypanosoma cruzi as the parasite of humans, Chagas additionally discovered that the parasite was responsible for a deadly heart disease now known as Chagas heart disease or Chagas cardiomyopathy. In 1909, he reported in the Brazilian medical journal, Brazil Médico, a case of human trypanosomiasis and noted the association with severe heart disease. In 1910, he further noticed that the parasitic infection could be classified into at least three different conditions, chronic heart disease, brain disorder, and thyroid problem, especially of goiter. He made an autopsy report of an individual with heart failure whom he found to have heavy trypanosome infection that was associated with blood cell accumulation (interstitial mononuclear cell infiltration) in the heart.

=== Trypanosoma minasense and Pneumocystis ===
Chagas was also the first to discover the parasitic fungal genus Pneumocystis in the lungs of his experimentally trypanosome-infected guinea pigs. In 1908, he reported in Brazil Médico the blood sample of marmosets had protozoan parasites that he named Trypanosoma minasense. He also described in it that the parasite was associated with another protozoan but which he could not identify. At the time, he did not recognize it as a separate organism from the protozoan he had identified, but believed it as part of the life cycle stage of the protozoan. Therefore, he described both the fungi and the protozoan as Schizotrypanum cruzi.

In 1912, French couple at the Pasteur Institute, Pierre Delanoë and Marie Delanoë identified and described the other parasite they found in rats. They knew that the parasite was not related to the trypanosomes and created a new genus Pneumocystis. The original name of the species Pneumocystis carinii was later changed to Pneumocystis jirovecii when it was established that the parasite is a fungus that causes human infection. Chagas followed the literature closely and quickly confirmed the distinction, whereupon he again adopted the name Trypanosoma cruzi for the protozoan. The original Pneumocystis species discovered by Chagas in guinea pigs has not yet been named as a separate species.

== Personal life ==
Chagas was a studious student. At the medical school, he was nicknamed "two-candle student" as he would use up two candles every evening for reading as there was no electricity in Rio de Janeiro at the time. It was during his medical course that his teacher, Miguel Couto, introduced him to a relative, Fernando Lobo. He eventually married Lobo's daughter, Iris.

One of his sons, Carlos Chagas Filho (1910–2000), became an eminent and internationally recognized scientist in the field of neurophysiology and president of the Pontifical Academy of Sciences. Another son, Evandro Chagas (1905–1940), was also a physician and researcher in tropical medicine, who died in a plane crash at 35 years of age. His name is honoured by the important biomedical institution Instituto Evandro Chagas, in Belém, state of Pará.

== Later life and death ==
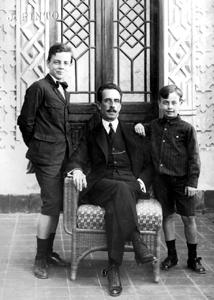
Carlos Chagas with his sons, Evandro Chagas and Carlos Chagas Filho

After the death of his mentor in 1917, Chagas accepted Cruz's directorship of the institute, a post he held until his own death in 1934. From 1920 to 1924, he became the director of the Department of Health in Brazil, the set up of which he initiated. Chagas was very active in organizing special health-care and prevention services and campaigns for the Spanish flu epidemics, sexually transmitted diseases, leprosy, pediatrics, tuberculosis, and rural endemic diseases. He created a nursing school and was the founder of the concept of sanitary medicine, the first chairman of tropical medicine and the graduate study of hygiene.

Chagas died in Rio de Janeiro from a heart attack in 1934, at the age of 55.

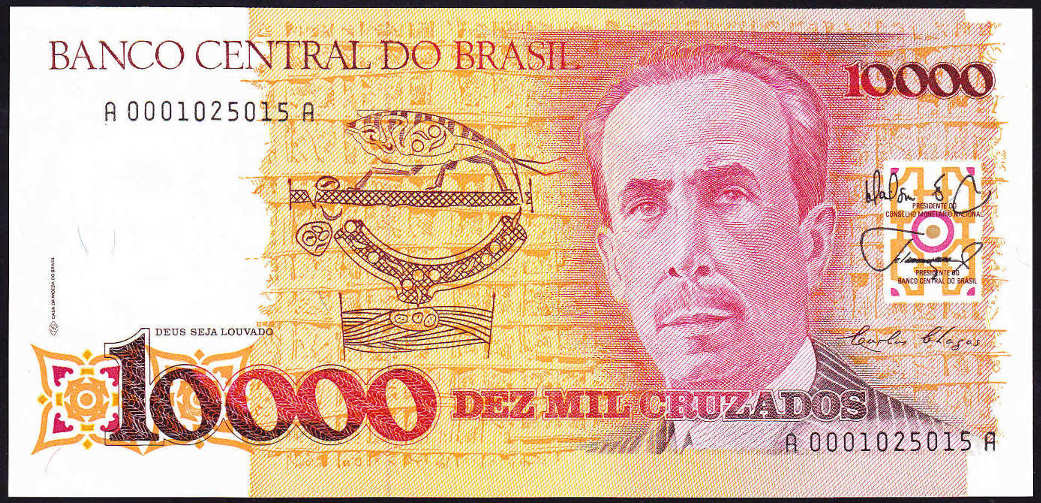
Chagas on a 1989 10,000 Brazilian cruzados banknote

== Awards and honours ==
Chagas was elected to the National Academy of Medicine and received the prestigious Schaudinn Prize for the best work in protozoology and tropical medicine, on June 22, 1912. The contenders included Paul Ehrlich (1854–1915), Emile Roux (1853–1933), Ilya Mechnikov (1845–1916), Charles Laveran (1845–1922), Charles Nicolle (1866–1936), and Sir William Boog Leishman (1865–1926), several of whom had already received or would receive the Nobel Prize for Medicine. Chagas was twice nominated for the Nobel Prize in Physiology or Medicine, in 1913 and 1921, but never received any.

In 1922, Chagas became a member of the Health Committee of the League of Nations.

Since 2020, The World Chagas Disease Day is observed by the World Health Organization every year on 14 April, commemorating the day Chagas discovered T. cruzi from Berenice.

== Nobel Prize controversy ==
Chagas' discovery was recognized at home and abroad as one of the most important achievements in parasitology. He was nominated for the Nobel Prize each time by only a single Brazilian nominator. In 1913, 63 scientists were nominated for the Nobel Prize in Physiology or Medicine, the top two nominees having received nine and eight nominations, respectively. In 1921, 42 scientists were nominated for the award, the top four nominees having received 11, nine, seven, and seven nominations, respectively. A hundred years after the discovery of the disease, speculation still remains regarding the two official nominations of Carlos Chagas for the Nobel Prize.

The reason why the prize was not awarded to Chagas may have been the strong opposition that he faced in Brazil, from some physicians and researchers of that time. They went as far as questioning the existence of Chagas disease, thereby possibly influencing the decision of the Nobel Committee not to award the prize to him. Analysis of the database of the Nobel Prize archives, with the revelation of the names of nominators, nominees, and prizewinners from 1901 to 1951, brought information not only about what was considered to be a scientific achievement at that time, but also about who the important scientists were and the relationships between them. The connections of the members of the Nobel Committee with the international scientific community, almost exclusively centered in European and North American scientists, also influenced their choices. The nonrecognition of Carlos Chagas' discoveries by the Nobel Committee appears to be more correctly explained by these factors than by the negative impact of the local opposition.
