= René Rachou =

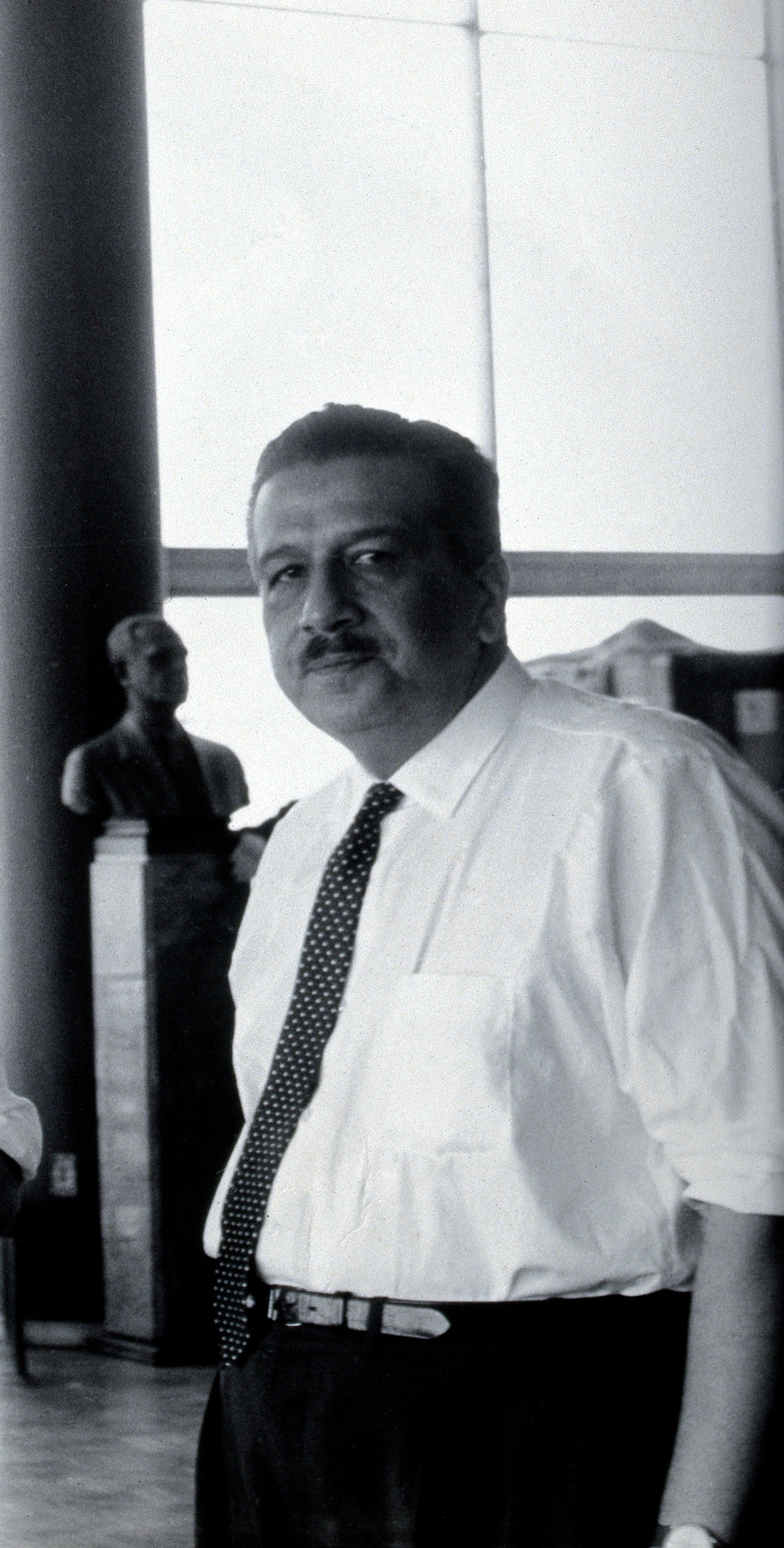
René Rachou

René Rachou was a Brazilian physician and researcher on malaria who was the director of the Institute of Malariology of the Oswaldo Cruz Institute in Rio de Janeiro. He also worked with the Pan-American Health Organization. The Institute was moved to Belo Horizonte in 1955, and, after his death, in 1965, it was renamed Centro de Pesquisas René Rachou in his honor.
