= Walter Omar Kohan =

Walter Omar Kohan is a Professor of Philosophy of Education at the State University of Rio de Janeiro, Brazil. He is also a researcher at the National Council for Scientific and Technological Development (CNPQ) and the Carlos Chagas Filho Research Support Foundation (FAPERJ). He was previously President of the International Council of Philosophical Inquiry with Children (ICPIC).
