= Alcântara Cyclone Space =

Defunct binational company between Brazil and Ukraine

- Company type: Government-owned corporation
- Industry: Launch service provider
- Founded: August 31, 2006
- Defunct: April 17, 2019
- Headquarters: Brasília, Federal District, Brazil
- Parent: Government of Brazil; Government of Ukraine
- Website: www.alcantaracyclonespace.com

Alcântara Cyclone Space (ACS) was a joint-venture with Brazilian and Ukrainian capital established on August 31, 2006 with the objective of commercializing and launching satellites using the Ukrainian space rocket Cyclone-4 (or Tsyklon-4) from the Alcântara Launch Center, in the Brazilian state of Maranhão. In July 2015, however, cooperation between the two countries was canceled by the government of Brazil.

== History ==
The creation of the company was carried out on October 21, 2003, with the signing of the Long-Term Cooperation Treaty in the Use of the Cyclone-4 Launch Vehicle. Negotiations between Ukraine and Brazil formally started on November 18, 1999, with the signing of the Framework Agreement on the Cooperation of Peaceful Uses of Outer Space. The initial investment for each country was set at US$ 80 million.

In March 2009, the Brazilian Government announced an increase in the company's financial capital by R$ 100 million, with R$50 million being the responsibility of each of the governments.

== Cancellation ==
On July 16, 2015, Brazilian Foreign Minister Mauro Veira officially announced the cancellation of the project with the Ukrainian government.

The decision was made for reasons of commercial viability, three years after Brazilian President Dilma Rousseff received the diagnosis from the Ministry of Science, Technology and Innovation, which pointed out that the project would not generate the projected profits from the commercial launch of satellites from Alcântara Launch Center. The program's initial budget was R$1 billion and the Brazilian government invested R$500 million in the project. In 2018, the Brazilian government sends Provisional measure 858 to the Brazilian Congress that provides for the extinction of the company, later converted, on April 17, 2019, into Law 13,814.

== See also ==
- State Space Agency of Ukraine
- Brazilian Space Agency
- VLS-1 V03
