= Memórias do Instituto Oswaldo Cruz =

- Discipline: Parasitology, microbiology, tropical medicine
- Language: English
- Edited by: Claude Pirmez

Publication details
- History: 1909-present
- Publisher: Oswaldo Cruz Foundation
- Frequency: 8/year
- Open access: Yes
- License: CC BY-NC
- Impact factor: 1.592 (2014)

Standard abbreviations
- ISO 4: Mem. Inst. Oswaldo Cruz

Indexing
- CODEN: MIOCAS
- ISSN: 0074-0276 (print); 1678-8060 (web)
- LCCN: ca11000118
- OCLC no.: 1197361

Links
- Journal homepage; Online access; Online archive; Online archive at SciELO

Memórias do Instituto Oswaldo Cruz (Portuguese for "Memoirs of the Oswaldo Cruz Institute") is a peer-reviewed open access medical journal covering parasitology, microbiology, and tropical medicine. It was established in 1909 by the Brazilian physician Oswaldo Cruz and is published by the Oswaldo Cruz Foundation (FIOCRUZ) eight times a year. The editor-in-chief is Adeilton Brandão (IOC/FIOCRUZ).

== Abstracting and indexing ==
The journal is abstracted and indexed in the following bibliographic databases:

- Biological Abstracts
- BIOSIS Previews
- Chemical Abstracts Service
- Current Contents/Life Sciences
- Excerpta Medica
- Index Medicus/MEDLINE/PubMed
- Science Citation Index
- SciELO
- Scopus
- Tropical Diseases Bulletin
- The Zoological Record

According to the Journal Citation Reports, the journal has a 2014 impact factor of 1.592.
