= Evandro Chagas =

Brazilian physician

Evandro Serafim Lobo Chagas
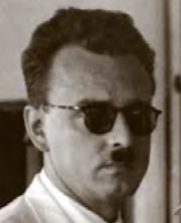
- Evandro in 1938
- Born: August 10, 1905
- Died: November 8, 1940 (aged 35); Rio de Janeiro, Brazil
- Occupations: Physician, Scientist

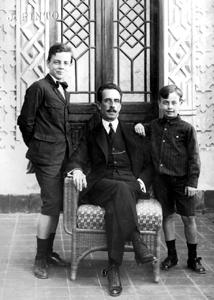
Evandro (left) with his father, Carlos Chagas and his brother Carlos Chagas Filho.

Evandro Serafim Lobo Chagas (August 10, 1905 – November 8, 1940) the eldest son of Carlos Chagas (1879-1934), noted physician and scientist who discovered Chagas disease, and brother of Carlos Chagas Filho (1910-2000), also a noted physician and scientist who was president of the Pontifical Academy of Sciences.

In 1926 Evandro Chagas graduated from the Faculty of Medicine of Rio de Janeiro and made residence at Hospital São Francisco de Assis and at Hospital Oswaldo Cruz. At the same time, he attended the specialization course in microbiology at the Instituto Oswaldo Cruz.

In 1930 he became professor at Clinical Infectious and Tropical Diseases (in Portuguese: Clínica de Doenças Tropicais e Infecciosas) at the Faculty of Medicine of Rio de Janeiro, whose discipline was taught by his father, Carlos Chagas. To fill the vacancy, he defended as a thesis the cardiac form of American trypanosomiasis. Being one of the pioneers in the use of electrocardiography has made significant contributions on Chagas disease.

He conducted studies on Yellow Fever, Malaria, Hookworm, and especially about the Leishmaniasis, discovering the first human cases of the disease and conducting clinical and epidemiological investigations in several states in Brazil and in Argentina.

In 1931 he held the position of Human Pathology Section (in Portuguese: Seção de Patologia Humana) of the Instituto Oswaldo Cruz and, in 1935, represented the institution at the Ninth Meeting of the Argentine Society of Pathology North Regional, held in the city of Mendoza to honor the memory of Carlos Chagas, newly deceased.

Upon returning from Argentina, he organized the service of Endemic Diseases Study, to coordinate a plan of medical and health research in several Brazilian states, promoting important research, especially on Malaria, Leishmaniasis and Chagas Disease. He also created, in 1936, the Institute of Experimental Pathology of North (in Portuguese: Instituto de Patologia Experimental do Norte), located in Belém, Pará state, Brazil it operated as a subsidiary of the Instituto Oswaldo Cruz; later it would bear his name, Instituto Evandro Chagas (today one of the best known institutes on tropical medicine and virology in the world).

Evandro Chagas died in an air crash in Rio de Janeiro on November 8, 1940, aged 35.
