= Museum of Life =

Museu da Vida Fiocruz
- Museu da Vida Fiocruz
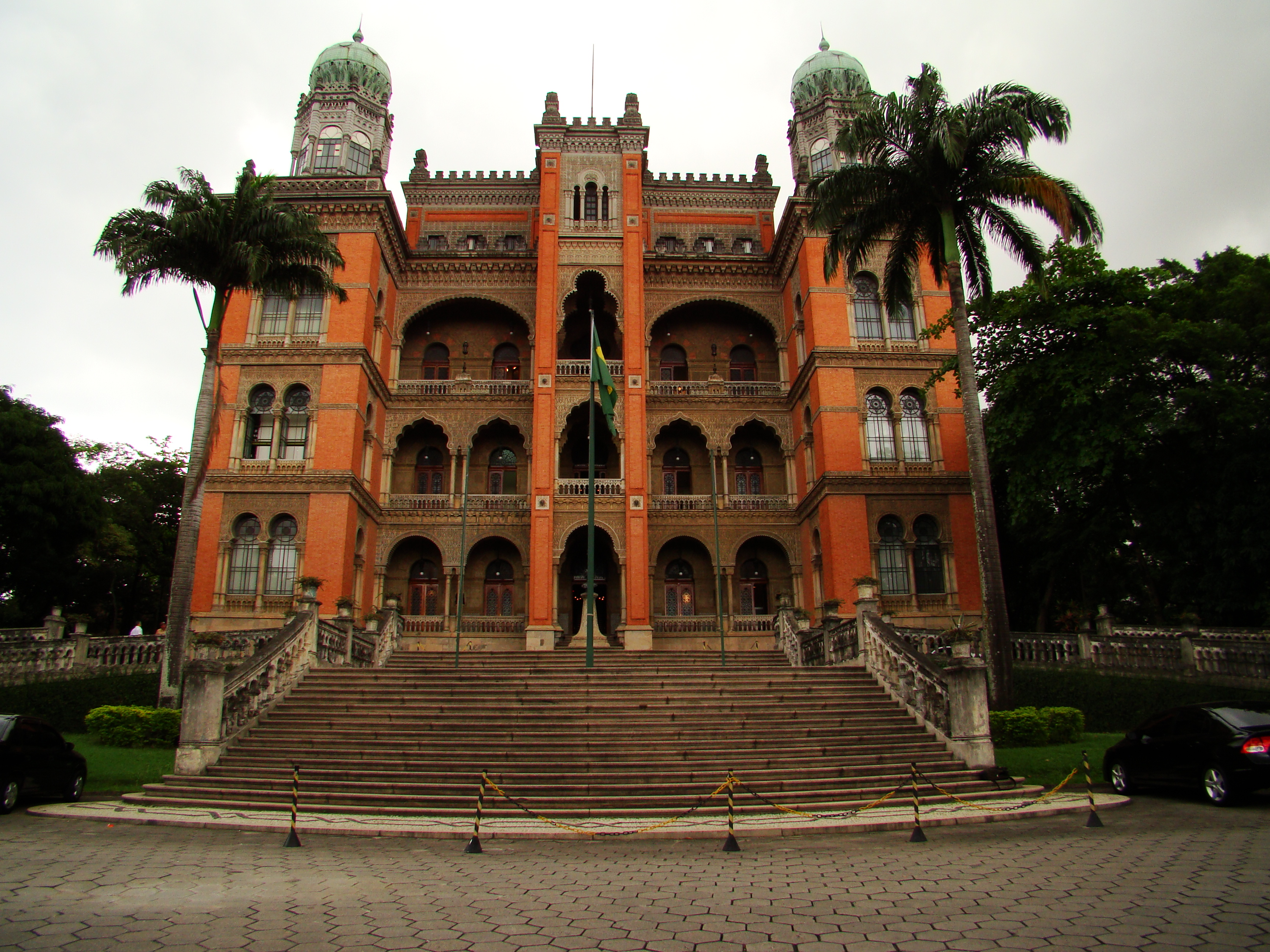
- Established: 1999
- Location: Pavilhão Mourisco, Rio de Janeiro, Brazil
- Type: science museum
- Website: Official website

The Museum of Life is located at the Oswaldo Cruz Foundation, in Rio de Janeiro, Brazil.

== Location ==
The museum is located on the campus of Oswaldo Cruz Foundation at Manguinhos, Rio de Janeiro.
