= Aristides Leão =

Brazilian professor of neurophysiology (1914-1993)

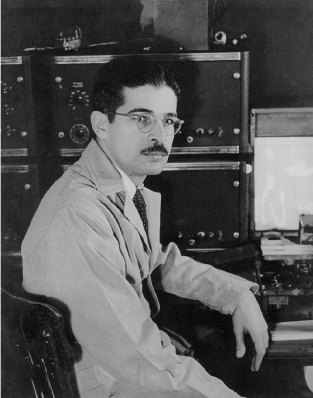
- Born: August 3, 1914; Rio de Janeiro, Brazil
- Died: December 14, 1993 (aged 79); São Paulo, Brazil
- Resting place: Rio de Janeiro
- Education: FMUSP (graduation); Harvard University (M.A., 1942 - PhD, 1943)
- Known for: Discovery of cortical spreading depression
- Spouse: Elisabeth Raja Gabaglia Leão aka Elisabeth Pacheco Leão
- Relatives: Candido Portinari (brother-in-law)
- Awards: Grand Cross of the National Order of Scientific Merit (1994)
- Scientific career
- Fields: Neurophysiology
- Workplaces: Federal University of Rio de Janeiro; Instituto de Biofísica Carlos Chagas Filho
- Thesis: Spreading depression of activity in the cerebral cortex (1944)
- Doctoral advisor: Arturo Rosenblueth; Hallowell Davis

Aristides Azevedo Pacheco Leão (August 3, 1914 – December 14, 1993) was a Brazilian neurophysiologist, researcher and university professor.

Leão discovered and described the spreading depression, which also became known as "the Leão wave". This depression is a reaction in the cerebral cortex that can be induced by touch or electric shock, although, more significantly, it occurs spontaneously in migraine and to some extent in epilepsy. It occurs not only in the brain, but in other neural structures.

Leão was president of the Brazilian Academy of Sciences between 1967 and 1981 and defended scientists persecuted by the military dictatorship. He created scientific journals and built important scientific collaborations between the academy and other scientific bodies. Elected president emeritus of the institution, he was awarded the Grand Cross of the National Order of Scientific Merit. The academy's library now bears his name.

== Biography ==
Leão was born on August 3, 1914, into a traditional family in Rio de Janeiro, the youngest of seven siblings. He never met his father, Manoel Pacheco Leão, who died shortly before Leão was born. His mother, the painter Francisca Azevedo Leão, raised the children alone, with the help of her brother-in-law, the biologist and director of the Rio de Janeiro Botanical Garden, Antônio Pacheco Leão, who assisted in the children's education. While living in a large house in the Laranjeiras neighborhood, the family was also helped by a British nanny of whom no records exist.

Leão entered the São Paulo School of Medicine in 1932 at the age of 18. However, he contracted tuberculosis in his second year and had to suspend his studies for two years, while being treated in Belo Horizonte. When he recovered, he decided that he would like to work in scientific research and moved to the United States in 1941, where he was admitted to the graduate research program at Harvard Medical School. He received his master's degree in 1942 and his doctorate of science in 1943.

=== Career ===
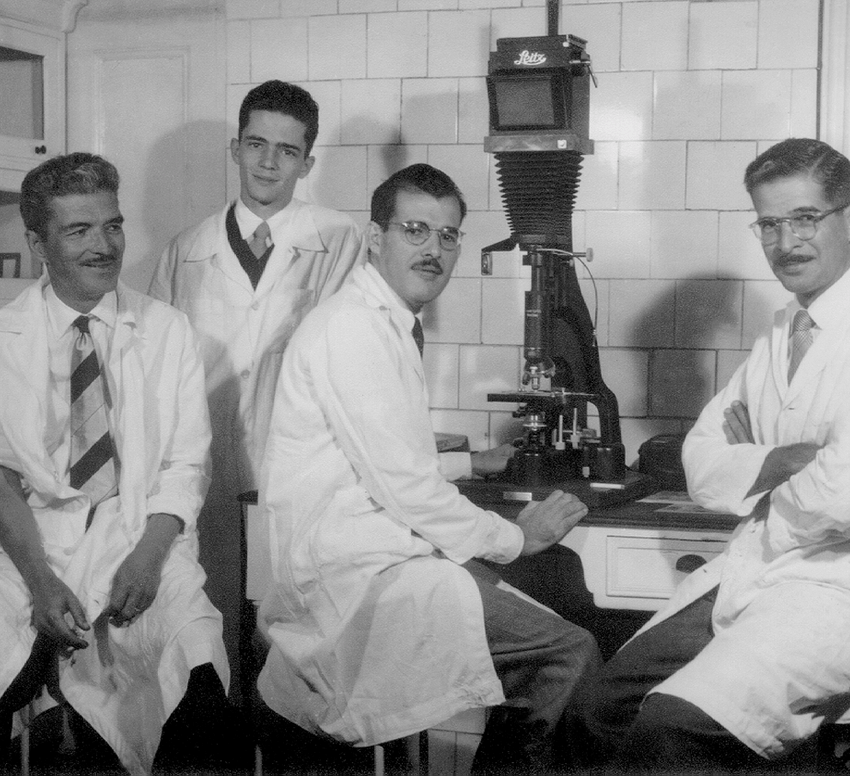
Team in the biophysics lab

In 1943, he became an adjunct researcher at Harvard's Department of Anatomy, where he identified the phenomenon of spreading depression, and although he had the opportunity to work in the United States, he preferred to return to Brazil in 1944, at the age of 32. Upon his return, he was appointed Specialized Technician of the Chair of Biological Physics (1945) at the National School of Medicine of the Federal University of Rio de Janeiro.

He was invited by Carlos Chagas Filho, to join the new Biophysics Institute, which was still being organized. His colleagues included Gustavo de Oliveira Castro. Romualdo José do Carmo and Hiss Martins Ferreira, He continued his research into cortical spreading depression. The instruments in his laboratory in Brazil were salvaged discards, but they were so carefully restored that they were always ready for use. Despite discouraging practical limitations, he did not abandon his work and so published his first article in Brazil. His first article on spreading depression, 'Spreading depression of electrical activity in the cerebral cortex,' the phenomenon was given the eponym of his name and called Leão's spreading depression.

Leão was director of the institute from 1966 to 1970 and emeritus head of the neurobiology department from 1984 to 1993. He became an associate of the Brazilian Academy of Sciences (1948) and a full member in 1951, and was its vice-president (1955–1957/1965–1967) and president for seven consecutive terms (1967–1981). He was a member of the Deliberative Council at CNPq (1960–1974) and then its scientific advisor (1975–1984). During the Brazilian military dictatorship, as President of the ABC, he also defended the Revista Brasileira de Biologia (Brazilian Journal of Biology) after its editors were arrested by the regime. While president he also encouraged scientific cooperation between Brazil and other countries. He was also, posthumously, president emeritus of the Brazilian Academy of Sciences.

After the cesium leak in Goiânia, in 1988, he became the president of the newly created State Commission of Radioprotection and Nuclear Safety. Between 1985 and 1991 he participated in the Planning and Science and Technology Secretariats of the Presidency of the Republic, as member and president of the Special Followup Group (GEA) of the Scientific Development Support Program (PADCT).

After his mandatory retirement, he was named Laboratory Head Emeritus of the Department of Neurobiology of the Carlos Chagas Filho Biophysics Institute, where he remained for nine more years as a CNPq research fellow.

==== Leão's Wave ====
Spreading depolarization seen using intrinsic optical signal imaging in gyrencephalic brain. Speed 50x.

Aristides Leão discovered the phenomenon while working on his thesis at Harvard in 1944. He named the phenomenon "spreading depression", but it became known as "the Leão's wave". The true causes of this depression are not known, but it can be induced by electric shocks. The description of this illness helped in the diagnosis of other diseases such as epilepsy. According to Leão's later investigations, it occurs not only in the brain, but also in other neural structures. His research on spreading depression is still widely cited within the medical literature and the spreading depression, in the case of brain damage, can be reversed provided that the blood flow is restored quickly. (Note: Jed Hartings in 2018 said that the process, in the case of patient death, is reversible within the first 10 minutes.) However, there is no guarantee that the neurons may survive.

===== History of Discovery =====
The earliest origin of what has come to be known as spreading depression dates back to 1906, when Sir William Richard Gowers, in a lecture on epilepsy, noted that “a peculiar spreading disturbance of the nerve structures is evident” and that lasts for several minutes, something that was confirmed and described by Aristides Leão in this way:

While working on his PhD thesis at Harvard under the supervision of Hallowell Davis, Leão aimed to study "experimental "epilepsy". To perform the experiment he opened anesthetized rabbit skulls and placed a row of silver electrodes in contact with the cortical surface, with two serving for stimulation. However, instead of a seizure-like discharge, the stimulation was followed by a flattening of the brain waves in a kind of domino effect, which recovered in the same way.

Somjen 2005 questions whether the ease with which this phenomenon can be caused did not cause other researchers to have observed it before Leão and dismissed it as an "annoying interruption of work" and goes on to say that this phenomenon intrigued him and became the main topic of Aristides' work, with his first article (Leão 1944a) demonstrating the basic characteristics that have been confirmed by other researchers. In a following article (Leão 1944b) he described how blood vessels behave during the event.

The third article (Leão 1947) in focus by Somjen 2005, made after Leão's return to Rio de Janeiro, deals with the slow voltage change that accompanies the phenomenon and the complete cerebral ischemia. Over the years other articles on the subject have been done, but it is still not understood why the spreading depression occurs.

=== Awards ===
The researcher is also remembered for his outstanding performance as president of the Brazilian Academy of Sciences between 1967 and 1981. His contribution to science earned him important scientific awards, such as the Einstein Award in 1961; the Prêmio Almirante Álvaro Alberto in 1973 and the Moinho Santista Award (now the Bunge Foundation Award), in 1974 and 1977. He also received posthumous tribute from the Brazilian Academy of Sciences, whose library today bears his name, being elected president emeritus of this institution on December 20, 1993.

== Death ==
Leão died on December 14, 1993, in São Paulo, at the age of 79, due to respiratory failure. He was buried in Rio de Janeiro, in the family grave.

== Legacy ==
According to Rodrigo Polito at Uol, Leão is the author of one of the most cited physiology articles in the world and dedicated his life to the development of science in his native country. Carlos Chagas Filho described him as "...one of the greatest scientists I knew, he was extremely simple and cultured, a great stimulator of research among young people and an exceptional professor of general and comparative physiology..." who left a great number of disciples in Brazil and abroad, besides having had a great influence on the projection of the Institute of Biophysics as an institution of excellence abroad. Mayevsky and Sonn describe Aristides Leão as one of Brazil's most renowned and internationally recognized scientists.

In 2002 it was demonstrated that depolarization occurs in human brains and in 2018, the article "Terminal spreading depolarization and electrical silence in death of human cerebral cortex", published in Annals of Neurology, for the first time revealed that the spreading depression described by Leão occurs in the human brain after the end of cardiac activity. In a possible coincidence, co-author Jed Hartings discovered that the series Star Trek: The Next Generation had laid out this process in general form in the episode Skin of Evil in much the same way as the 2018 research, which leads co-researcher Jens Dreier to believe that the scriptwriters may have borrowed from similar research (or even Leão's). In 2023, Parisian scientists, investigating the brains of rats, identified the possible point of origin of the spreading depolarization and theorized the possibility of reversing it.

== Personal life ==
Leão enjoyed sport fishing, classical composers, Brazilian popular music and being considered by his colleagues as having a "prodigious culture", his ornithology collection surpassed that of the National Museum, although he considered himself an amateur in the field. In doing so, he also developed as a naturalist and had in Charles Darwin his main reference. He also behaved as a humble person, despite his academic position and achievements. Jacques Veilliard considers Aristides to be the father of bioacoustics in Brazil.

== Scientific papers ==
- Leão, Aristides A. P. (1944a). "Spreading depression of activity in the cerebral cortex". J. Neurophysiol. 7 (6): 359–390. doi:10.1152/jn.1944.7.6.359.
- Leão, Aristides A. P. (1944b). "Pial circulation and spreading depression of activity in the cerebral cortex". J. Neurophysiol. 7 (6): 391–396. doi:10.1152/jn.1944.7.6.391.
- Leão, A. A. P.; Morison, R. S. (1945). "Propagation of spreading cortical depression". J. Neurophysiol. 8 (1): 22–45. doi:10.1152/jn.1945.8.1.33.
- Leão, Aristides A. P. (1947). "Further observations on the spreading depression of activity in the cerebral cortex". J. Neurophysiol. 10 (6): 409–414. doi:10.1152/jn.1947.10.6.409. PMID 20268874.

== See also ==
- Neuroscience
- Migraine
- Headache

== Bibliography ==
- Almeida, Darcy Fontoura de (2012). "A contribuição de Carlos Chagas Filho para a institucionalização da pesquisa científica na universidade brasileira". Dossiê Carlos Chagas Filho (in Brazilian Portuguese). 19 (2): 653–668. doi:10.1590/S0104-59702012005000002. PMID 22473447.
- Andrews, Robin (2018). "Pioneering Study Reveals What Happens To Your Brain As You Die". Iflscience. Archived from the original on 2018-03-05.
- Alfering, Yannah (2018). "This Neurologist Found Out What Happens to Our Brains When We Die". Iflscience. Archived from the original on 2020-11-09.
- Botaro; Negreiros; Mancilio; Lúcio; Almeida (2020). "Aristides Pacheco Leão: Revisitando a História de um Neurocientista". Espaço Memorial Carlos Chagas Filho (in Brazilian Portuguese). Archived from the original on 2021-11-09.
- Fessl, Sophie (2018). "The End Comes as a Wave". Dana. Archived from the original on 2021-06-24.
- Ciência, Canal (2018). "Agraciados pela Ordem Nacional do Mérito Científico". Canal Ciência (in Brazilian Portuguese). Archived from the original on 2020-02-29.
- Ciência, Divulga (2014). Unicamp (ed.). "Divulga Cientista – Aristides Pacheco Leão". Ciência em Revista (in Brazilian Portuguese). Archived from the original on 2021-11-09.
- Dreier; Major; Foreman; Winkler; Kang; Milakara; Lemale; DiNapoli; Hinzman; Woitzik; Andaluz; Carlson; Hartings (2018). "Terminal spreading depolarization and electrical silence in death of human cerebral cortex". Annals of Neurology. 83 (2): 295–310. doi:10.1002/ana.25147. PMC 5901399. PMID 29331091.
- Duque-Estrada, Maria Inês. "Aristides Leão". Canal Ciência. Archived from the original on 2018-06-12.
- Engelhardt; Gomes (2015). "Aristides Leão: a birth centennial homage with comments on his spreading depression" (PDF). Arq Neuropsiquiatr. 6 (73): 544–546. doi:10.1590/0004-282X20150045. PMID 26083892.
- Filho, Carlos Chagas (2000). "Instituto de Biofísica Carlos Chagas Filho" (PDF). Um aprendiz de ciência (PDF) (in Brazilian Portuguese). Fiocruz. p. 279. doi:10.7476/9788575412473. ISBN 85-209-1082-3. Archived (PDF) from the original on 2017-08-09. (Internet Archive)
- Hale, Tom (2018). "A Neuroscientist Found Out What Happens To The Brain When We Die - Then Realized That Star Trek Figured It Out First". Iflscience. Archived from the original on 2018-04-26.
- Letzter, Rafi (2018). "Dying Brains Silence Themselves in a Dark Wave of 'Spreading Depression'". Live Science. Archived from the original on 2018-02-28.
- Maranhão-Filho; Vincent (2009). "Professor Aristides Leão. Much More Than Spreading Depression". Headache. 49 (1): 110–116. doi:10.1111/j.1526-4610.2008.01210.x. ISSN 0017-8748. PMID 18647182. S2CID 32463240.
- Negreiros; Botaro; Lúcio; Almeida; Gouveia; Coelho; Mancilio; Saraiva; Marins (2014). "Vitrine Aristides Pacheco Leão: Revisitando a história de um Neurocientista" (PDF). Scientiarum Historia (in Brazilian Portuguese) (VII): 9. ISSN 2176-1248. Archived (PDF) from the original on 2021-11-09.
- Newcomb, Tim (2023). "There's a 'Wave of Death' in Every Human Brain. Scientists Are Scrambling to Stop It". Popular Mechanics.
- Mayevsky, Avraham; Sonn, Judith (2022). Cortical Spreading Depression of Leao. Springer International Publishing. p. 420. ISBN 9783031080685.
- Polito, Rodrigo (2003). "Na onda de Aristides Leão". Ciência Hoje (in Brazilian Portuguese). Archived from the original on 2006-05-12.
- Rogawski, MA. (2012). Jasper's Basic Mechanisms of the Epilepsies (ed.). "Migraine and Epilepsy—Shared Mechanisms within the Family of Episodic Disorders" (PDF). Noebles JL (4 ed.).
- Somjen, G. G. (2005). "Aristides Leão's discovery of cortical spreading depression". Journal of Neurophysiology. 95 (1): 2–4. doi:10.1152/classicessays.00031.2005. PMID 15985690.
- Thompson, Ann (2018). "The Sounds Inside Your Brain Right Before Death". WVXU. Archived from the original on 2021-11-12.
- Velloso; Gitirana (2001). "Arquivo Fotográfico Aristides Azevedo Pacheco Leão". História Ciências Saúde-Manguinhos (in Brazilian Portuguese). 8 (2): 454–458. doi:10.1590/S0104-59702001000300008.

Preceded by Carlos Chagas Filho	President of the Brazilian Academy of Sciences; 1967-1981	Succeeded by Maurício Matos Peixoto
