= Osvaldo Cruz =

Osvaldo Cruz may refer to:

- Osvaldo Cruz, São Paulo, Brazilian municipality
- Osvaldo Cruz Futebol Clube, Brazilian football club in Osvaldo Cruz, São Paulo
- Osvaldo Cruz (footballer) (1931–2023), Argentine footballer

== See also ==
- Oswaldo Cruz (disambiguation)
