= Fiocruz Genome Comparison Project =

BOINC based World Community Grid subproject

The Fiocruz Genome Comparison Project is a collaborative effort involving Brazil's Oswaldo Cruz Institute and IBM's World Community Grid, designed to produce a database comparing the genes from many genomes with each other using SSEARCH. The program SSEARCH performs a rigorous Smith–Waterman alignment between a protein sequence and another protein sequence, a protein database, a DNA or a DNA library.

The nature of the computation in the project allows it to easily take advantage of volunteer computing. This, along with the likely humanitarian benefits of the research, has led the World Community Grid (a volunteer computing grid that uses idle computer clock time) to run the Fiocruz project. All products are in the public domain by contract with WCG.

== Description ==
The problem is that a very large information body (structural, functional, cross-references, etc.) is attached to protein database entries. Once entered the information is rarely updated or corrected. This annotation of predicted protein function is often incomplete, uses non-standard nomenclature or can be incorrect when cross referenced from previous sometimes incorrectly annotated sequences. Additionally, many proteins composed of several structural and/or functional domains are overlooked by automated systems. The comparative information today is huge when compared to the early days of genomics. A single error is compounded and then made complex.

The Genome Comparison Project performs a complete pairwise comparison between all predicted protein sequences, obtaining indices used (together with standardized Gene Ontology) as a reference repository for the annotator community. The project provides invaluable data sources for biologists. The sequence similarity comparison program used in the Genome Comparison Project is called SSEARCH. This program mathematically finds best local alignment between sequence pairs, and is a freely available implementation of the Smith–Waterman algorithm.

SSEARCH's use makes possible a precise annotation, inconsistencies correction, and possible functions assignment to hypothetical proteins of unknown function. Moreover, proteins with multiple domains and functional elements are correctly spotted. Even distant relationships are detected.

== See also ==
- Comparative genomics
