= Oswaldocruzia panamaensis =

Scientific classification
- Kingdom: Animalia
- Phylum: Nematoda
- Class: Chromadorea
- Order: Rhabditida
- Family: Molineidae
- Genus: Oswaldocruzia
- Species: O. panamaensis

Binomial name
- Oswaldocruzia panamaensis Bursey, Goldberg & Telford, 2007

Species of roundworm

Oswaldocruzia panamaensis is a species of gastrointestinal nematode that completes its life cycle in lizards, first found in Panama.
