= Provisional measure =

Constitutional power of the President of Brazil

A provisional measure (Portuguese: medida provisória) is a legal act in Brazil through which the President of Brazil can, "in important and urgent cases", enact laws effective for a maximum of 60 days without approval by the National Congress. Upon enacting one, the President is required to immediately submit it to Congress for approval or rejection. The provisional measure may be renewed once for an additional 60 days, after which, it will cease to be in force unless Congress has approved it and made it law. There are two requirements for a provisional measure to be used: urgency and relevance of the matter to be regulated; Provisional measures may not affect:

- political rights
- criminal law
- organization of the Judicial branch
- the budget
- private property

In addition, provisional measures may not affect that which is reserved for complementary law, or is already included in a bill submitted to the president by the National Congress and awaiting approval.
