= Oswaldo Cruz =

Brazilian physician and bacteriologist (1872–1917)

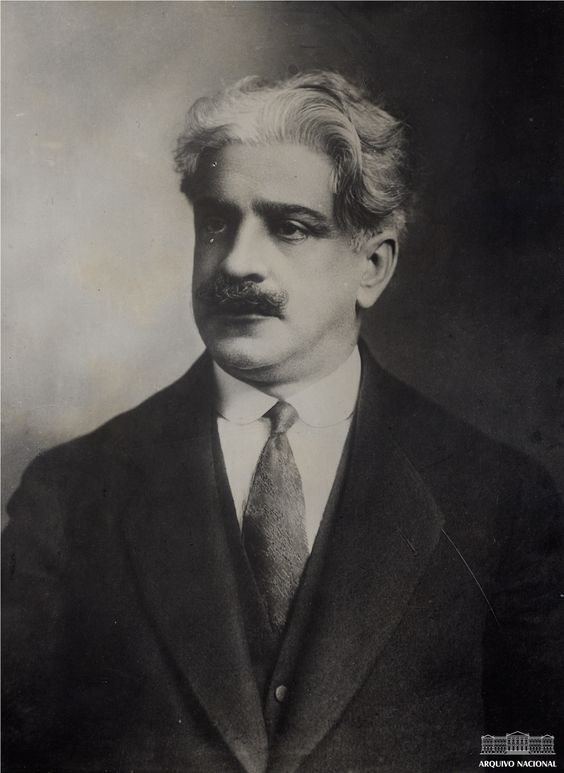
- Born: Oswaldo Gonçalves Cruz; August 5, 1872; São Luís do Paraitinga, São Paulo, Empire of Brazil
- Died: February 11, 1917 (aged 44); Petrópolis, Rio de Janeiro, Brazil
- Education: Federal University of Rio de Janeiro
- Scientific career
- Fields: Physician
- Workplaces: Instituto Oswaldo Cruz

Oswaldo Gonçalves Cruz (Portuguese pronunciation: [ozˈvawdu ˈkɾus]; August 5, 1872 – February 11, 1917), was a Brazilian physician, pioneer bacteriologist, epidemiologist and public health officer and the founder of the Oswaldo Cruz Institute.

He occupied the fifth chair of the Brazilian Academy of Letters from 1912 until his death in 1917.

== Early years ==
Oswaldo Gonçalves Cruz was born on August 5, 1872, in São Luis do Paraitinga, a small city in São Paulo Province, to the physician Bento Gonçalvez Cruz and Amália Bulhões Cruz. As a child, he moved to Rio de Janeiro with his family. At the age of 15 he started to study at the Faculty of Medicine of Rio de Janeiro and in 1892 he graduated as a medical doctor, with a thesis on water as vehicle for the propagation of microbes. Inspired by the work of Louis Pasteur, who had developed the germ theory of disease, four years later he went to Paris to specialize in bacteriology at the Pasteur Institute, which gathered the great names of this branch of science of that time. He was financed by his father-in-law, a wealthy Portuguese merchant.

== Career ==
=== Work in Brazil ===
Cruz found that the seaport of Santos was ravaged by an epidemic of bubonic plague that threatened to reach Rio de Janeiro, and engaged himself immediately in the combat of this disease. The mayor of Rio de Janeiro authorized the construction of a plant for manufacturing the serum against the disease which had been developed at the Pasteur Institute by Alexandre Yersin and coworkers. He asked the institution for a scientist who could bring this know-how to Brazil. The Pasteur Institute responded that such a person was already available in Brazil: Oswaldo Cruz.

On May 25, 1900, the Federal Serum Therapy Institute was created, intended for the production of sera and vaccines against the bubonic plague, with Baron Pedro Afonso as director general and the young bacteriologist Oswaldo Cruz as technical director. The new institute was established in the old farm of Manguinhos at the western shores of Guanabara Bay. In 1902, Cruz accepted the office of director general of the institute and soon expanded the scope of its activities, now no longer restricted to the production of sera but also dedicated to basic and applied research and to the building of human resources. In the following year, Cruz was appointed director general of Public Health, a position corresponding to today's Brazilian Minister of Health.

Using the Federal Serum Therapy Institute as a technical-scientific base, he embarked on a quick succession of important sanitation campaigns. His first challenge was a series of yellow fever endemics, which had earned Rio de Janeiro the sinister reputation of 'Foreigners' Grave'. Between 1897 and 1906, 4,000 European immigrants had died there from the disease. Cruz pursued the new technique of eradicating mosquitoes and their breeding grounds, fumigating houses, and isolation of the ill. There was opposition to the campaign by many, including physicians, the military, and the poor, but the campaign was successful. Cruz was initially successful in the sanitary campaign against the bubonic plague, to which end he used obligatory notification of cases, isolation of sick people, treatment with the sera produced at Manguinhos and extermination of the rats populating the city.

=== Smallpox vaccination controversy ===
He was not successful in implementing a widespread vaccination against smallpox, due to popular resistance to it. In 1904, a smallpox epidemic was threatening the capital. In the first five months of the year, more than 1,800 people had been hospitalized. A law imposing smallpox vaccination of children had existed since 1837 but had never been put into practice. Therefore, on June 9, 1904, following a proposal by Oswaldo Cruz, the government presented a bill to the Congress requesting the reestablishment of obligatory smallpox vaccination. The extremely rigid and severe provisions of this instrument terrified the people. Popular opposition against Cruz increased sharply and opposition newspapers started a violent campaign against this and the federal government in general. Members of the parliament and labor unions protested. An anti-vaccination league was organized.

On November 10, the Vaccine Revolt exploded in Rio. Violent confrontations with the police ensued, with strikes, barricades, and shootings in the streets, as the population rose in protest against the government. On November 14, the cadets of the Military Academy joined the revolt, but were dispersed after intense shooting. The government declared a state of siege. On November 16, the uprising was controlled, but the obligatory vaccination was suspended.

In 1908, a violent smallpox epidemic made the people rush en masse to the vaccination units. Some 9,000 people died. Cruz was vindicated and his merit recognized.

=== Later work ===
Among the international scientific community, his prestige was already uncontested. In 1907, on occasion of the 14th International Congress on Hygiene and Demography in Berlin, Cruz was awarded with the gold medal in recognition of the sanitation of Rio de Janeiro. In 1909, he retired from the position as director general for Public Health, dedicating himself exclusively to the Manguinhos Institute, which has been named after him. From the institute he organized important scientific expeditions, which allowed a better knowledge about the health and life conditions in the interior of the country and contributed to the colonization of regions. Cruz eradicated urban yellow fever in the state of Pará. His sanitation campaign in the state of Amazonas allowed the completion of construction of the Madeira-Mamoré railroad, which had been interrupted due to the great number of deaths from malaria and yellow fever among the workers.

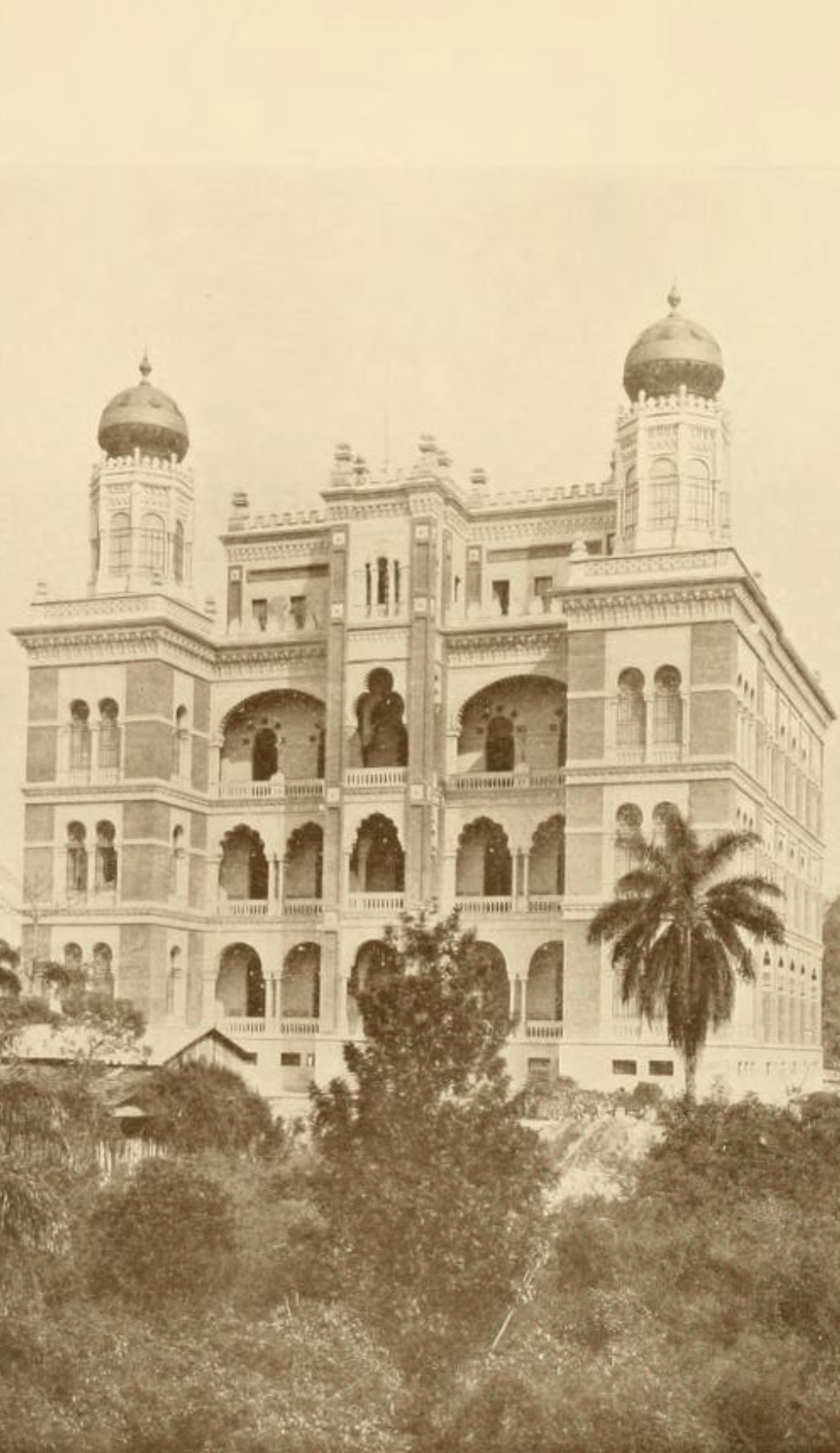
“The Oswaldo Cruz Institute”

In 1913, Cruz was elected a member of the Brazilian Academy of Arts and Letters. In 1915, due to health problems, he resigned from the directorship of the Oswaldo Cruz Institute and moved to Petrópolis, a small city in the mountains near Rio. On August 18, 1916, he was elected mayor of that city and outlined an extensive urbanization project he would not see implemented.

== Death and legacy ==
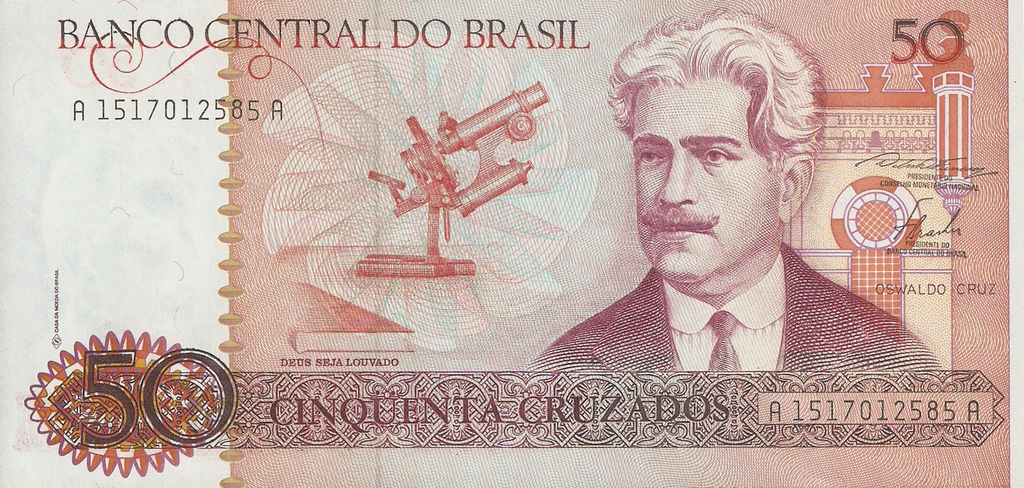
Oswaldo Cruz on a 1986 50 Brazilian cruzados banknote

In the morning of February 11, 1917, at 44 years of age, he died of kidney failure in Petrópolis, Rio de Janeiro state.

Thanks to Oswaldo Cruz, an extremely important scientific and health institution was born, which marked the beginning of experimental medicine in Brazil in many areas. To this day it exerts a strong influence on Brazilian science, technology and public health.

In Brazil, several neighborhoods, schools, and public institutions are named after him. Some examples are the neighborhood of Oswaldo Cruz, Rio de Janeiro, the Rodovia Oswaldo Cruz in São Paulo, and the aforementioned health institute Oswaldo Cruz Foundation.

Preceded by Raimundo Correia (founder)	Brazilian Academy of Letters - Occupant of the 5th chair 1912 — 1917	Succeeded by Aloísio de Castro
