= Oswaldo Cruz Foundation =

Brazilian medical research institute

Coordinates: 22°52′29.57″S 43°14′43.58″W

Oswaldo Cruz Foundation Fundação Oswaldo Cruz
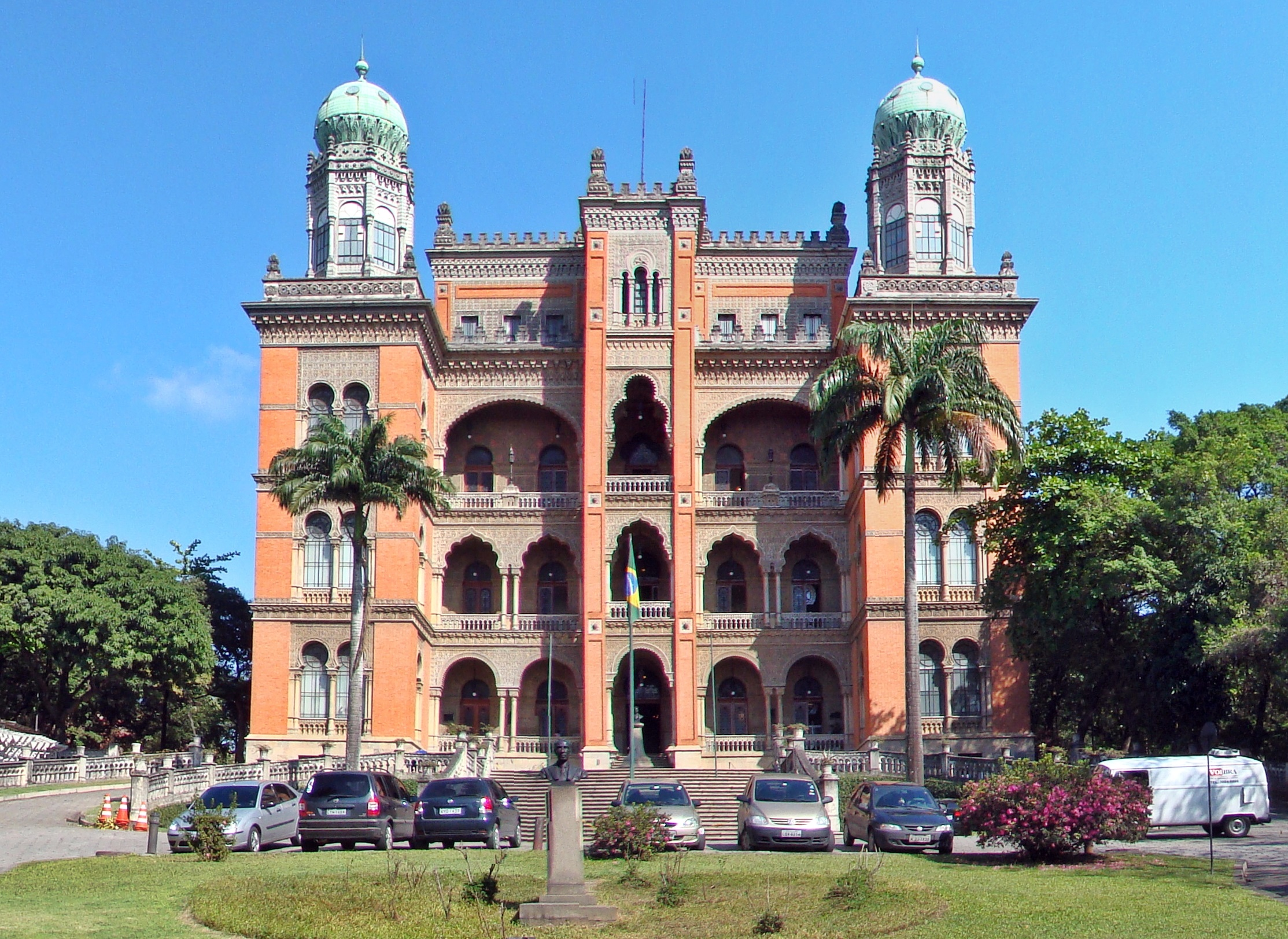
- Founded: 25 May 1900; 126 years ago
- Founder: Oswaldo Cruz
- Location: Rio de Janeiro, RJ, Brazil
- Official languages: Portuguese
- Key people: Nísia Trindade Lima (President)
- Website: Fiocruz

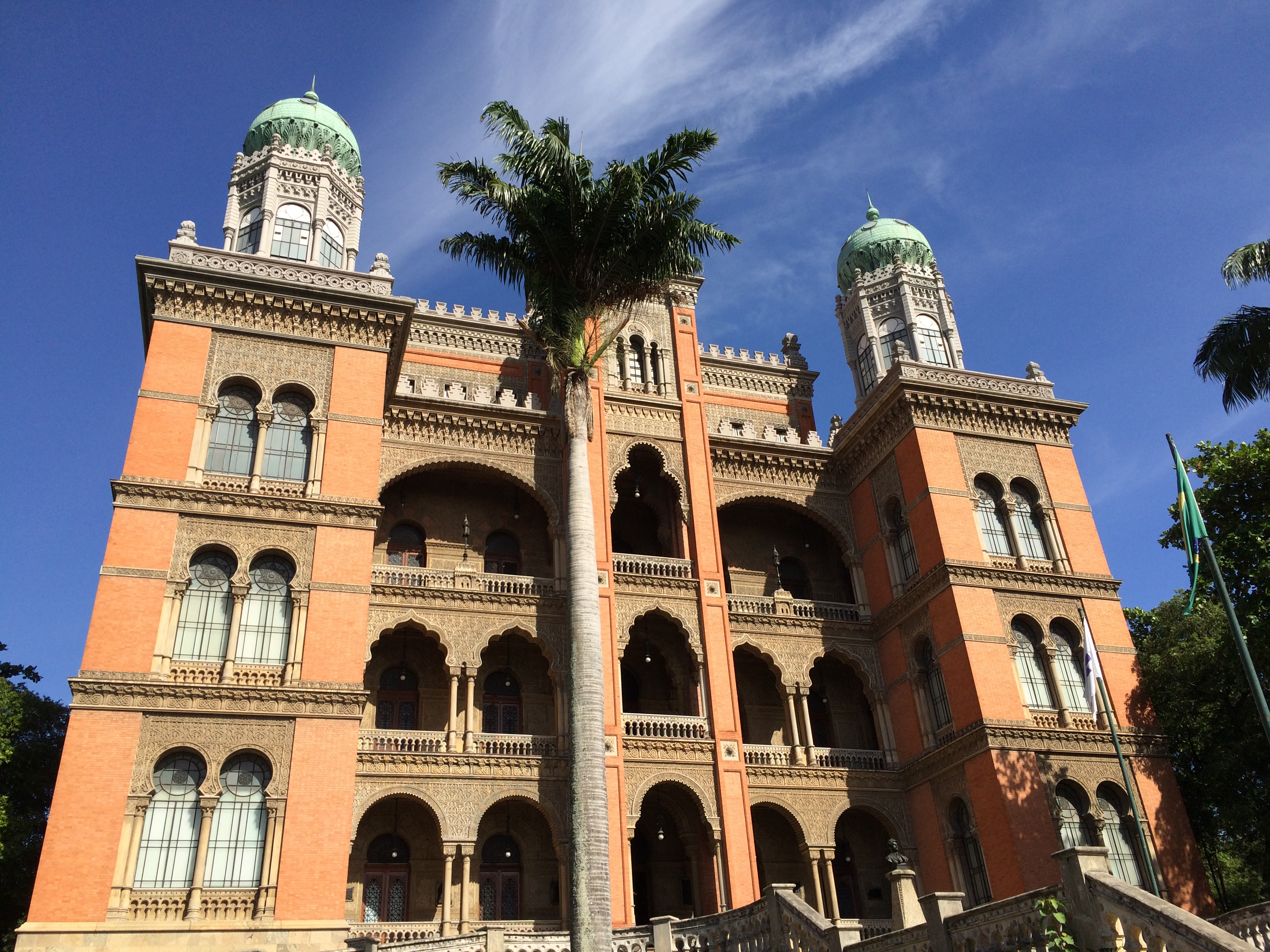
Neo-Moorish façade of the Palace of Manguinhos, site of the Oswaldo Cruz Institute in Rio de Janeiro.

The Oswaldo Cruz Foundation (Portuguese Fundação Oswaldo Cruz, also known as FIOCRUZ) is a scientific institution for research and development in biological sciences located in Rio de Janeiro, Brazil; it is considered one of the world's main public health research institutions. It was founded by Oswaldo Cruz, a noted physician and epidemiologist.

== History ==
The organization started in 1898 as the Federal SeroTherapy Institute with the objective of developing serum and vaccines against the bubonic plague. It was located outside Rio de Janeiro. The institute's activities, however, changed from simple production into research and experimental medicine, especially after Oswaldo Cruz assumed its leadership in 1902. From there on, the institute became the base for memorable sanitation campaigns in an age of outbreaks and epidemics of the bubonic plague, yellow fever, and smallpox. The institute, however, was not confined to Rio de Janeiro and collaborated in the occupation of the country's interior through scientific expeditions, aiding in the development of the country.

When Oswaldo Cruz died in 1917, the institute, which by then already bore his name, was nationally consolidated and important scientific achievements followed, such as Carlos Chagas’ description of the complete cycle of the American trypanosomiasis including the clinical pattern of the disease.

Through the regulations enacted in 1919 and 1926, the different areas of scientific activity were divided into six "sections" in order to establish a clearer division of labor between production routines and research work. The 1919 regulation created the Applied Chemistry section, while the 1926 regulation added sections for Bacteriology and Immunity, Medical Zoology, Mycology and Phytopathology, Anatomical pathology, and Hospitals. The Bacteriology and Immunity section was responsible for preparing vaccines and serums, analyzing medicines sold to the public, and conducting bacteriological tests required for public health.

In addition to the scientific sections, the new regulations also established administrative sections such as the secretariat, maintenance, storeroom, and archives, as well as auxiliary sections, which included photography and microphotography, the library, and the distribution of serums and vaccines, among others. This reorganization allowed for an expansion of the staff, including the hiring of laboratory assistants and technical-administrative personnel.

The expansion of these activities also required the development of infrastructure, with the construction of new stables and pavilions. Among these buildings were the Chemistry Pavilion, which housed the chemistry and mycology laboratories, and the Official Medicines Service. During this period, construction of the Manguinhos Hospital was also completed. Conceived by Oswaldo Cruz and named in his honour, this hospital was established to study contagious diseases and provide patient care, playing a crucial role in assisting patients during the smallpox epidemics of 1925–26 and the yellow fever epidemics of 1928–29. In 1940, the hospital was renamed Hospital Evandro Chagas, in honor of its then-director, Evandro Chagas.

Today the institution has a broad range of responsibilities related to the health and wellbeing of the Brazilian population, functioning as a national institute of health for the Brazilian government. These responsibilities include

- hospital and ambulatory care,
- health-related research,
- development of vaccines, drugs, reagents, and diagnostic kits
- research, development and production,
- training of public health and health workers,
- providing information and communications related to health, science, and technology.

The Fiocruz workforce members number over 7,500. Fiocruz includes several fixed facilities in Rio de Janeiro and other locations; however, it contributes to improving health throughout the country, through its support to the Sistema Único de Saúde (Unified Health System, the Brazilian public health system), its proposals on public health policy-making, its research activities, its scientific expeditions, and the reach of its health services and products.

Fiocruz is one of the founding members of the International Association of National Public Health Institutes, a membership organization of national public health institutes. The foundation has a longstanding collaboration with GISAID, analyzing and curating COVID-19 virus data in the Americas, then quickly contributing those genetic sequences to the repository.

In 2026, Fiocruz's data storage capacity decreased by 97.6%, provided by Microsoft, from 30 petabytes to 730 terabytes, affecting OneDrive, SharePoint, and institutional webmail. Between 2012 and 2020, Fiocruz spent more than R$ 28 million on purchases with Microsoft and, in 2025 alone, R$ 11.6 million. Federal government invests billions nationwide towards foreign technology, mostly the Big Techs, instead of supporting national science, which puts population in focus for digital sovereignty.

== See also ==
- Fiocruz Genome Comparison Project
- Museum of Life
- Memórias do Instituto Oswaldo Cruz
