= Miguel Rolando Covian =

Argentine-Brazilian physiologist and educator (1913–1992)

- Born: 7 September 1913; Rufino, Santa Fe, Argentina
- Died: 5 February 1992 (aged 78)
- Education: University of Buenos Aires
- Scientific career
- Institutions: University of Buenos Aires, Institute of Experimental Biology and Medicine of Buenos Aires, Johns Hopkins University, University of São Paulo

Miguel Rolando Covian (September 7, 1913 – February 5, 1992), was an Argentine-Brazilian physiologist, medical educator and writer.

== Biography ==
=== Early life and education ===
Covian was born in Rufino, Santa Fe Province, Argentina, on September 7, 1913. He studied at the Faculty of Medicine of the University of Buenos Aires, where, while a student, he worked also as a teaching assistant in the Chair of Physiology. He graduated in 1942 and soon thereafter started a full-time career in research on Physiology, initially in collaboration with Bernardo Houssay, the great Argentine physiologist, who later was awarded with the 1947 Nobel Prize in Medicine and Physiology for his investigation on the interaction between the hypophysis and the pancreas in the control of glucose metabolism. From 1945 to 1948, Covian worked at the Institute of Experimental Biology and Medicine of Buenos Aires, a private research institution which Houssay and co-workers had founded in 1944, due to his dismissal from the University due to political persecution by the dictatorial regime of Edelmiro Farrell. There, he worked also with another eminent physiologist, Eduardo Braun-Menéndez, and presented his doctoral dissertation in 1948.

=== Fellowship ===
After his doctorate Covian went for a post-doctoral fellowship by the Rockefeller Foundation, at the Johns Hopkins University, Baltimore, United States. There he worked on the physiology of hemidecorticated animals and neurovegetative control, with several important physiologists, such as Phillip Bard, Carl Richter and Vernon Mountcastle. He returned three years later to Argentina, to continue his participation at the Institute of Experimental Biology and Medicine, where, in 1952, he established the first experimental laboratory of neurophysiology of Argentina.

=== Research ===
In 1955 Covian was already well known internationally for his research on the neurophysiology of the limbic system. He accepted an invitation from Dr. Zeferino Vaz to join the faculty of the recently founded School of Medicine of Ribeirão Preto of the University of São Paulo, at Ribeirão Preto, São Paulo, Brazil, as the chairman of the Department of Physiology, a post he held until 1974 and from 1978 to 1982. Under Covian's able and humane leadership, the Department would grow to become one of the main excellence centers of research and education in Latin America, with an excellent scientific staff, with prominent researchers such as Eduardo Krieger, Renato Migliorini, César Timo-Iaria, José Antunes Rodrigues, José Venâncio Pereira Leite and fellow Argentines Maria Carmelo Lico, Andrés Negro-Vilar and Ricardo F. Marseillan. Covian was involved in all aspects of scientific and educational progress in the physiological sciences. It was there too that Covian founded the first Brazilian laboratory of neurophysiology.

=== Leadership ===
Covian was extremely active as a scientific leader. He was one of the founders and a president of the Brazilian Society of Physiology. He also was a strong force behind the graduate programs of the School of Medicine of Ribeirão Preto, and an innovator in the use of new approaches to the teaching of physiology. He was active in the editorial boards of several international scientific journals, such as "Physiology & Behavior" and the monograph series of "Progress in Brain Research", a member to several international committees, the International Brain Research Organization and the Latin American Federation of Physiological Sciences.

=== Systematic study ===
Covian's main achievement in neurophysiology was the systematic study, with a large group of collaborators, of the neural basis of thirst, of neuroendocrine regulation of hydroelectrolytic homeostasis, and of appetitive behavior, i.e., the behavior which permit animals to seek and to ingest particular foodstuffs or diet components, an activity which depends on many external and internal factors. The animal model used by Covian's group was the selective ingestion of water versus salt water in albino Norwegian rats, which they investigated with many approaches and tools, such as after lesions and stimulations of the central nervous system, measurement of metabolic activity, manipulation of the activity of the endocrine system, and the effect of several kinds of drugs. He also studied the role of the limbic system (particularly the septal area) on many behaviors and functions, such as the control of blood pressure and the neuroendocrine regulation of reproductive behavior.

=== Humanist ===
Covian was also a humanist, deeply interested in the history and philosophy of science, history of medicine, epistemology, religion, classical music and erudite art. He retired at the mandatory age of 70, as a professor emeritus, but continued to appear regularly his office in the department

=== Death ===
Honored by his many colleagues, pupils and friends, Covian died on February 5, 1992, following complications of a stroke.

== Bibliography ==
- Covian, MR: Studies on the neurovegetative and behavioral functions of the brain septal area. Prog Brain Res. 1967;27:189-217.
- Covian, MR: Fisiologia del Área Septal. Conferéncias Eduardo Braun Menéndez. Buenos Aires, 1967.
