= Maria Carmela Lico =

Italian-Brazilian physiologist

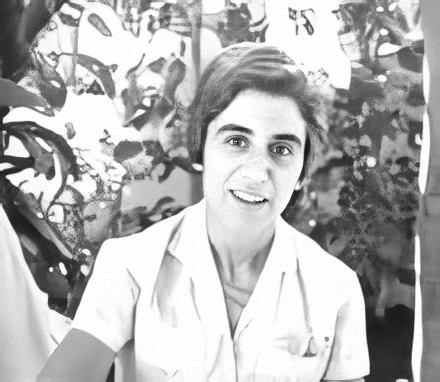
- Born: 1927; Italy
- Died: 1985 (aged 57–58); Brazil
- Other name: Maria Carmela Licco
- Occupation: Physiologist
- Known for: Behavioral physiology

Maria Carmela Lico or Licco (1927–1985) spent most of her research life as a physiologist studying the neural mechanisms of pain at the Department of Physiology of the Faculdade de Medicina de Ribeirão Preto (Brazil). Lico produced important insights on the descending control of nociception by limbic structures, specially the septal nuclei.

== Biography ==
Maria Carmela Lico was born in Italy in 1927, but soon moved with her family to Argentina. During her childhood in Italy, Lico fell ill with an infectious disease that would later "weaken her immune system" and impact her ability to stand the effects of chemotherapy, leading to her death in 1985.

In Argentina, Lico studied medicine and philosophy, simultaneously, at the University of Buenos Aires; however, Lico was unable to finish the latter course. Fascinated with the workings of the mind, Lico entertained the idea of following psychiatry as a field of practice during medical school, an idea that was abandoned after 2 years of clinical practice. Lico studied under Nobel laureate Bernardo Houssay at the Instituto de Biología y Medicina Experimental, and defended her doctoral thesis on the action of neurohypophysarian hormones on arterial pressure in the frog. While endocrinology was the field that gave Bernardo Houssay his Nobel Prize for Physiology or Medicine, Lico was more interested in neurophysiology, an area which, at the Instituto, was under the leadership of Miguel Rolando Covian. Since Covian had recently moved to the Faculdade de Medicina de Ribeirão Preto, Lico decided to move to Brazil and, in 1960, joined Covian at the University of São Paulo with the help of a Rockefeller Foundation scholarship.

In 1963, Lico was invited by Covian to join the faculty as a teaching assistant. In 1970, Lico made a short visit to Yale University, in the laboratory of professor José Manuel Rodriguez Delgado, where she studied the behavior of primates, applying telemetry techniques to infer physiology-behavior relationships. In 1981, Lico applied for full professorship at Ribeirão Preto, a position she held until she died of cancer in 1985.

== Research topics ==
Maria Carmela Lico was interested in behavioral neuroscience since her undergraduate studies. While her PhD research under Houssay focused mainly on neuroendocrinology and cardiac control – her first article was on a method for permanent aortic cannulation in toads – soon she joined Miguel Rolando Covian in the field of neurophysiology. As most researchers under the guidance of Covian, Lico was interested in a wide variety of topics, and it has been said that her personal library – composed mainly of fiction and art books – attests this observation. Together with Venâncio Pereira Leite and Ricardo Francisco Marseillan, Lico spent most of her time manually producing electrodes, canulae and other equipment necessary for the implementation of novel techniques. As recorded by Anette Hoffmann:

When I arrived at Ribeirão Preto in 1966, I had the opportunity to begin my scientific education by participating in projects developed by Maria C. Lico and Miguel R. Covian. In those times, acute experiments with anesthetized animals were usual. The laboratory technician, Mr. Osvaldo Del Vecchio, a tailor by trade, performed surgeries with extreme competence. Maria C. Lico conducted experiments. Covian, who was the department head, was summoned to the experimental room only at the moments in which animals were subjected to the proposed experimental treatments. During intervals, which could take up to 30 minutes, Maria C. Lico dove into reading books – not on physiology, but fiction. By the time I met her, she had read the fiction from the Argentinian writer Julio Cortázar, and practically ignored my presence in the room. She was fascinated by the adventure of discovery. Her curiosity was endless. She would allow herself to wander through the pathways opened during a given experiment when she realized something new could be discovered, even though this could lead to deviating considerably from the original research line. She did not publish lavishly. Certainly she would be rejected due to a lack of productivity at the contemporary university.

Along with Covian, Lico studied pressor responses to the stimulation of septal nuclei. During these experiments with anesthetized animals, Lico began to observe that, as the anesthetic plane became more superficial, guinea pigs started to vocalize and move, which she considered objective signs of nociception. Lico observed that these signs were abolished by septal stimulation. Based on those observations, she conceived an experiment in which a noxious stimulus that was applied to the dental pulp did not produce nocifensive behavior when preceded by the electrical stimulation of the septal nuclei. A year before her first findings were presented at the annual congress of the Latin American Association for Physiological Sciences, Reynolds published his paper on the antinociceptive effects of periaqueductal gray electrical stimulation in rats. These findings would pave the discovery of the endogenous analgesic system. However, while most posterior researchers focused on the role of the limbic opioid system in the modulation of pain, Lico studied the role of monoamines in other regions, including the area postrema, the caudate and the medial forebrain bundle.

After James Reston, while accompanying Richard Nixon in a trip to China, was subjected to post-operative acupuncture at the Anti-Imperialist Hospital in Beijing, Lico got particularly interested in how this technique could induce the activity of endogenous analgesic system. At first, Lico studied the effects of electroacupuncture on human patients. Later, Lico demonstrated that the perfusate taken from the paw of a rat which was subjected to electroacupuncture could reduce or abolish the cortical evoked potential elicited by a noxious stimulus applied to the dental pulp. They were unable to identify the analgesic substance; by 1975, when Hughes and Kosterlitz described the potent analgesic effects of endorphins, Lico and Garcia-Leme were convinced that the substance generated by electroacupuncture was an endorphin. At the end of the 1970s, Lico advised Renato Sabbatini and Isaías Pessotti, both of whom would become important behavioral scientists in Brazil.
