= Eduardo Krieger =

Brazilian physician

- Born: 27 June 1928 (age 98); Cerro Largo, Rio Grande do Sul, Brazil
- Education: Medical school of the Federal University of Rio Grande do Sul; University of Georgia at Augusta
- Known for: Work on hypertension
- Scientific career
- Fields: Medicine, physiology
- Institutions: Instituto de Biología y Medicina Experimental, Buenos Aires; School of Medicine of Ribeirão Preto of the University of São Paulo
- Doctoral advisor: Miguel Rolando Covian
- Other academic advisors: Eduardo Braun-Menéndez, W. Hamilton

Eduardo Moacyr Krieger (born 27 June 1928, Cerro Largo, Rio Grande do Sul) is a Brazilian physician, physiologist and scientific leader, a former president of the Brazilian Academy of Sciences.

== Life ==
Krieger was born to a family of German origins, in the small city of Cerro Largo, in the southernmost state of Brazil, Rio Grande do Sul. In 1946, he moved to Porto Alegre to study medicine at the Medical School of Porto Alegre. There, while he was a student, he began working with Prof. Rubens Maciel at the Cardiology Department and decided to pursue a university career in the clinical area.

In 1954, he started a training program for new physiologists, created by CAPES in Porto Alegre under the coordination of Prof. Maciel. Since Brazil had few physiological research labs at the time, the program was partly supervised by Argentine physiologists, under Prof. Bernardo Houssay's leadership (Nobel Prize, 1947). Having made himself noted for his brilliance and dedication, young Eduardo was invited to work on experimental hypertension with Prof. Eduardo Braun-Menéndez in Porto Alegre and Buenos Aires, at the famous Instituto de Biología y Medicina Experimental created by Houssay. This opportunity represented a major influence on his later professional career. He then completed his training in cardiovascular physiology with Prof. W. Hamilton at the University of Georgia at Augusta, U.S., from 1956 to 1957.

Back in Brazil, he was invited to work at the Department of Physiology of the recently created School of Medicine of Ribeirão Preto of the University of São Paulo, in the city of Ribeirão Preto, state of São Paulo. His sponsor was Prof. Miguel Rolando Covian, the new departmental chairman and an Argentine neurophysiologist who had belonged to Prof. Houssay's group and who became very impressed with Krieger during his formative years in Porto Alegre and Buenos Aires. Covian was not disappointed: Krieger completed his doctoral dissertation at Ribeirão Preto under the supervision of Prof. Covian and quickly matured as a strong scientific leader by himself. Besides heading an internationally renowned research group on experimental hypertension, he created the department's cardiovascular physiology group, which became a very influential school for many new physiologists in Brazil. As a result, new laboratories headed by Krieger's former pupils were created in several other universities, in Ribeirão Preto, São Paulo, Belo Horizonte, Vitória, Porto Alegre and Recife.

Dr. Krieger retired in 1983 from the Medical School of Ribeirão Preto, and since then has been working in hypertension research at the Heart Institute of the Faculty of Medicine of the University of São Paulo, in São Paulo City, having under his direction a multidisciplinary research group, including molecular biologists, physiologists and clinical physicians. He is married and has a son and a daughter, both scientists and research professors.

Professor Krieger was co-president designate of the 2014 World Health Summit.

== Research ==
Dr. Krieger's main research field is the study of experimental hypertension in animal models and the physiological mechanisms of blood pressure regulation, mainly its neurogenic mechanisms. He described a method for performing the denervation of the sino-aortic baroceptor in the Norwegian rat which is widely used. His studies on the baroreceptor adaptation in hypertension and hypotension are widely recognized and have been published in the main scientific journals of the field. Dr. Krieger is one of the most highly cited Brazilian researchers.

He was also a pioneer in using the rat as a model for the study of blood pressure regulation in sleep and exercise, as well as in the neural recording of electrical activity of the sympathetic system in physiological conditions. In collaboration with Prof. Sérgio Henrique Ferreira in the last phase of the discovery of a new ACE inhibitor extracted from Bothrops venom, he demonstrated experimentally its efficacy in the reversion of experimental hypertension, thus opening the way for the eventual development of a new antihypertensive drug, captopril (trademarked Capoten) by Squibb scientists.

== Scientific leadership ==
Along with his activities as a professor and researcher, Dr. Krieger has also made great contributions to the development of science and higher education in Brazil. He participated in the university reform at USP from 1968 to 1969, and cooperated with many research grants committees of CNPq (Brazilian National Research and Development Council, Ministry of Education (CAPES) and the São Paulo Foundation for Research Support (FAPESP). He was one of the founders and a President of the Brazilian Society of Physiology (1979–1985), founder and the first President of the Brazilian Federation of Societies of Experimental Biology (FESBE - 1985–1991), and founder and first President of the Brazilian Society of Hypertension (1992–1994). He was also one of the three editors who founded and directed the Brazilian Journal of Medical and Scientific Research, one of the best international scientific journals of high quality in the country. He belongs to both the Brazilian Academy of Sciences and to the Brazilian Academy of Medicine (elected 1998).

At the international level, Prof. Krieger was a Director of the Committee on Science and Technology in Developing Countries (COSTED) starting on 1998, and a member of the Third World Academy of Sciences (TWAS) since 1995, and was a President of the Inter-American Society of Hypertension,

Dr. Krieger has published more than 120 full papers in international journals. Under his supervision, 19 graduate students got their master's degrees and 23 their doctoral degrees.

Among his many prizes and awards, Prof. Krieger holds the national decorations of the National Order of Scientific Merit by the Presidency of the Republic of Brazil (1994) and the Comenda da Legião do Mérito do Engenheiro Militar (Commend of the Legion of Merit of Military Engineer, 1999), the Lifetime Achievement Award of the Interamerican Society of Hypertension (1997), the Almirante Álvaro Alberto em Medicina e Saúde Pública Award (National Science Award) by the National Council of Scientific and Technological Development (1998), and the Anísio Teixeira Award by the Ministry of Education (2001).

== Selected bibliography ==
- KRIEGER, E. M. 1970. Time-course of baroreceptor resetting in acute hypertension. American Journal of Physiology. vol. 218, p. 486-490.
- KRIEGER, E. M., SALGADO, H. C., ASSAN, C. J., GREENE, L. J. and FERREIRA, S. H.. 1971. Potential screening test for detection of overactivity of renin-angiotensin system. The Lancet. vol. 6, p. 69-271.
- KRIEGER, E. M. 1984. Neurogenic hypertension in the rat. In Handbook of Hypertension. Elsevier Science Publishers: vol. 4, p. 350-363. In: JONG, W. DE (ed.) Elsevier Science Publishers B.B. "Experimental and Genetic Models of Hypert
- MICHELINI, L. C. and KRIEGER, E. M. 1986. Aortic caliber changes during development of hypertension in freely moving rats. American Journal of Physiology. vol. 251, p. 662-671.
- KRIEGER, E. M. 1986. Neurogenic mechanisms in hypertension: resetting of the baroreceptors - State of the Art Lecture. Hypertension. vol. 8, p. 7-14. April
- FRANCHINI, K. G. and KRIEGER, E. M. 1992. Carotid chemoreceptors influence arterial pressure in intact and aortic-denervated rats. American Journal of Physiology. vol. 262, p. 677-683.

== Sources ==
- Adapted from Eduardo Moacyr Krieger Biography. Brazilian Academy of Sciences, 2004.
