= Núcleo de Informática Biomédica =

The Núcleo de Informática Biomédica (in English, Center for Biomedical Informatics) of the State University of Campinas (NIB), in Campinas, Brazil, was an interdisciplinary center for research, development and education in medical informatics, founded July 1983 by the university, under the deanship of José Aristodemo Pinotti. Its founder and first director was Renato M.E. Sabbatini. NIB closed down in February 2004, after the retirement of Sabbatini.

NIB was one of the earliest university-based research centers on the subject of biomedical informatics to be officially established in the country.

== Internet publications ==
Starting 1996, NIB created a number of websites to provide health-related information. The center also published several online magazines, as well as bulletins and newsletters distributed by email lists. NIB also created a project of scientific electronic publishing, the e*pub Group, where several exclusively on-line publications were created under it, such as the On-Line Journal of Plastic and Reconstructive Surgery and the On-Line Journal of Dentistry and Oral Medicine.
