= Fritz Köberle =

- Born: 1 October 1910; Eichgraben, Austria
- Died: 20 February 1983 (aged 72); Americana, São Paulo, Brazil
- Education: University of Vienna
- Known for: Discovery of the neurogenic mechanism of the chronic phase of Chagas disease
- Scientific career
- Fields: Pathology of infectious diseases
- Workplaces: University of Münster, University of Vienna; General Hospital of St. Pölten, Lower Austria; University of São Paulo, Ribeirão Preto; State University of Campinas, Campinas, São Paulo

Fritz Köberle (1 October 1910 in Eichgraben, Austria – 20 February 1983) was an Austrian-Brazilian physician, pathologist and scientist, discoverer of the neurogenic mechanism of the chronic phase of Chagas disease, a human parasitic disease caused by Trypanosoma cruzi, a protozoan.

== Life ==
Fritz Köberle was born in Eichgraben, Austria, and studied medicine at the University of Vienna, Austria, graduating magna cum laude in 1934. He began to work in the Institute of Pathology while he was a student and, soon after his 1935 graduation, he was admitted as an assistant professor. With the annexation of Austria to Germany (Anschluss), Köberle was drafted into the Army as a medical lieutenant and worked as a pathologist in the Central Army Hospital of Vienna. With the outbreak of the Second World War hostilities, Köberle was attached as field pathologist to the XII Army Group of the Wehrmacht in 1940 and served in the fronts of France, Belgium, Poland and Russia. He was able to acquire during this period an enormous experience on the pathology of infectious diseases (bacterial dysentery, typhus, typhoid fever, tularemia and malaria) as well as war-inflicted wounds, and performing more than four thousand autopsies. After the war, Köberle returned to the University of Münster as Privatdozent, continuing his activities as professor and researcher of medical pathology until 1945. He returned briefly to the University of Vienna, and, in 1946, accepted a post as director of the Serological and Pathological Institute of the General Hospital of St. Pölten, Lower Austria.

In 1952, he received an invitation which would radically change his personal and scientific life. A new medical school was being established by the University of São Paulo in Ribeirão Preto, in the hinterland of the state of São Paulo, Brazil. The main objective of the state government was to increase the number of physicians in the rapidly developing hinterland, and its first dean, Dr. Zeferino Vaz, a parasitologist, medical research and professor of the university, wished to create a favorable environment for high quality medical research and teaching in the new school. With this in mind, Vaz invited a number of foreign researchers to become chairmen of the basic and clinical departments, and Fritz Köberle had a good recommendation by Prof. Henrique da Rocha Lima, a Brazilian medical researcher who had studied in Germany. Dr. Köberle accepted an invitation and moved with his family to the Medical School of Ribeirão Preto in 1953. He soon organized the Department of Pathology, became its chairman, and began to assemble a small group of Brazilian researchers.

== Works ==
While in Ribeirão Preto, Köberle noted that a promising field of research in pathology for the new department and himself could be Chagas disease, or American trypanosomiasis, which had been discovered by another Brazilian physician named Carlos Chagas, in 1910. Even though 40 years had passed since its discovery, little was known about the peculiar manifestations of the chronic phase of the disease, such as megaesophagus, megacolon, cardiomegaly, heart ventricular aneurysm, achalasia, etc., and the mechanism of the causation of these several pathologies. By making good use of the extensive caseload of fatalities due to Chagas disease in the region of Ribeirão Preto and Southern Minas Gerais, where it was endemic and widely prevalent at the time, Köberle studied initially the dilation pathologies of the digestive tract and proved, by extensively quantifying the number of neurons of the autonomic nervous system in the Auerbach's plexus, that: 1) they were strongly reduced all over the digestive tract; 2) that megacolon and megaesophagus appeared only when there was a reduction of over 80% and 55% of the number of neurons, respectively; 3) these pathologies appeared as a result of the disruption of the neurally integrated control of peristalsis (muscular annular contraction) in those parts where a strong force is necessary to impel the luminal bolus of food or feces; and 4) European idiopathic megaesophagus and Chagas megaesophagus appeared to have the same etiology, namely the degeneration of the Auerbach's myoenteric plexus.

Studying the typical features of the Chagasic myocardium pathology, characterized by damage to its electrical conduction pathways, heart arrhythmia, aneurysm of the ventricular apex, cardiomegalia and sudden death by ventricular fibrillation, Köberle and his group of collaborators were able to prove that they were caused also by an extensive denervation of the parasympathetic (55%) and sympathetic (35%) intrinsic cardiac nervous networks, leading to a control imbalance of contraction, cardiac failure, cardiomegalia and hypoxia. He named this constellation of effects as cardiopathia parasympathicopriva. Other less typical phenomena observed in Chagas disease, such as bronchiectasis and myelopathy were also studied by Köberle under the new prism of his neurogenic theory.

Thus, with his classical and detailed scientific studies, Köberle proposed for the first time a unified and radically different (and polemical) view of the etiopathogeny of Chagas disease, characterizing it as a disease of the autonomic nervous system, which establishes itself during the acute phase and provokes long term and slowly installing denervation. Since the trypanosoma does not seem to damage neurons directly, Köberle and other researchers have hypothesized the action of a neurotoxin, cytotoxic factors or autoimmune mechanisms.

Köberle retired from the University of São Paulo in 1976, but soon moved as visiting professor to the Medical School, of the State University of Campinas, in Campinas, São Paulo, where one of his sons, Gottfried Köberle, is a professor of Orthopedics. He worked there until his death, in 1983, in Americana. Another son, Roland Köberle, is a professor in Physics at the University of São Paulo at São Carlos.

== Miscellaneous ==
The square in front of the main entrance to the USP campus at Ribeirão Preto is named in his honor.

== Bibliography ==
- Koeberle, F. Cardiopathia parasympathicopriva. Munch. Med. Wochenschr.. 1959 Jul 31;101:1308-10.
- Koeberle, F. Enteromegaly and cardiomegaly in Chagas disease. Gut. 1963 Dec;41:399-405.
