= Lucien Lison =

Belgian-Brazilian scientist (1908–1984)

Lucien Alphonse Joseph Lison (1908–1984) was a Belgian-Brazilian physician and biomedical scientist, considered the "father of histochemistry".

Lison was born in Trazegnies, Belgium. He studied medicine at the Universite Libre de Bruxelles, graduating in 1931. Deciding for a career in experimental biological research, Lison started to work in histology, developing a number of new techniques for dyeing specific substances present in a slice of tissue. Before the advent of radiolabeling, this was the only group of techniques which could infer function based on biochemical activity and it represented a great promise not only for basic science, such as physiology and pharmacology, but for pathology and laboratory diagnosis of diseases, as well. He developed the Lison-Dunn stain, a technique using leuco patent blue V and hydrogen peroxidase to demonstrate hemoglobin peroxidase in tissues and smears. In 1936, Lison wrote a landmark paper, where he stated precisely the scientifically acceptable criteria to develop techniques of morphological evidence of cytochemical processes.

In 1950, together with J. Pasteels, he developed a new histophotometer and a technique which he used extensively to quantify DNA content in several types of cells, present in chromatin (chromosomes in the nucleolus). This approach became a widely used laboratory tool in the beginning of the new science of molecular biology and genetics.

In 1951, using this technique with the Feulgen reaction, both authors studied the amount of DNA in the nuclei of developing sea urchin eggs and showed for the first time the important fact that each time that morphogenesis is accompanied by an intense mitosis, the amount of nuclear DNA is increased in this region.

Lison also contributed extensively to the understanding of metachromasy, the histochemistry of phosphatases and of lipids. In 1952, Lison published a truly monumental textbook on animal histochemistry, which became a classic in the field, unifying and integrating many concepts. With this, he was hailed as the "father of histochemistry".

In 1953 he was invited by Prof. Zeferino Vaz, the founder and director of the Medical School of Ribeirão Preto, in the campus of Ribeirão Preto of the University of São Paulo, to chair the Department of Histology. Europe was living through the difficult post-war years and the concept proposed by Vaz was revolutionary and intrinsically motivational for Lison and other Europeans who had accepted similar invitations. After a year of work, the Department of Anatomy of the new institution was merged with the Department of Histology, under the single denomination of Department of Morphology, under Lison's leadership. Dr. Lison became a full professor and chairman with the thesis titled "Influence of Fixative Agents on the Histochemical Reaction of Amine Groups", a very important work for neurochemistry. In 1960, he published a textbook, "Animal Histochemistry and Citochemistry, Principles and Methods", an expansion and update on his first book.

Lison had a very active and eclectical mind, as well as a legendary memory. He also wrote a text on biostatistics in 1958, and 10 years later, he started also to experiment with new approaches to medical education and educational technology. In 1964 he created and was the first director of a new school in the campus of Ribeirão Preto, the Faculty of Philosophy, Sciences and Letters, which began with baccalaureate courses in biology and psychology. Following Zeferino Vaz's example, he invited several foreign professors to staff its faculty.

After his retirement, Dr. Lison dedicated himself with his characteristic enthusiasm to agriculture. He acquired a farm near Ribeirão Preto and experimented with new techniques. After suffering a stroke, he famously declared his joy with it, because he had forgotten all the plots of his beloved detective books and could read them all again!

Dr. Lucien Lison's only son, Michel Pierre Lison, is a neurologist and full professor at the School of Medicine of Ribeirão Preto.

A scientific award and the main auditorium of the School of Philosophy, Science and Letters of Ribeirão Preto, and a street in the campus of the University of São Paulo were named after him.

== Bibliography ==
- Histochimie animale, Gauthier Villars, Paris, 1953.
- Statistique appliquée à la biologie expérimentale; la planification de l'expérience et l'analyse des résultats. Publisher: Paris, Gauthier-Villars, 1958.
- Histochimie et cytochimie animales, principes et méthodes. Paris, Gauthier-Villars, 1960.
- Lison L. La recherché histochimique des phosphatases. Étude critique. Bull. histol. appl. et tech. microscop., 1948; 25: 23-41
- Lison L., Mutsaars W., Metachromasy of nucleic acids. Quart. J. Microscop. Sci., 1950; 91: 309-314.
- Lison L. Progres recents de l'histochimie quantitative. Ann Soc R Sci Med Nat Brux. 1950;3(3-4):154-68. PMID 14811250
- Lison L. Etude et realisation d'un photometre a l'usage histologique. Acta Anat (Basel). 1950;10(4):333-47. PMID 14810402
- Pasteels J, Lison L. Recherches histophotometriques sur la teneur en acide desoxyribosenucleique au cours de mitoses somatiques. Arch Biol (Liege). 1950;61(3):445-74. PMID 14790821
