= SBIC =

SBIC may refer to:

- Small Business Investment Company
- Schwarz's Bayesian information criterion
- Communist Party of Brazil, or Communist Party – Brazilian Section of the Communist International, in Portuguese, (Partido Comunista), Seção Brasileira da Internacional Comunista, SBIC, as it was known from 1922 until 1962
- Sociedade Brasileira de Investigação Clínica, one of the supporting agencies of the Brazilian-based English-language medical research journal Brazilian Journal of Medical and Biological Research
- The International Civil Aviation Organization airport code (ICAO) four-letter code for Itacoiatiara Airport, the airport at Itacoiatiara, Amazonas, Brazil
- Society of Biological Inorganic Chemistry
- Sustainable Buildings Industry Council, a US-based professional association committed to encouraging sustainable architecture
- Sloan Biotechnology Industry Center, one of the research centers of the University of Maryland School of Public Policy
