= Lewis Joel Greene =

American-Brazilian scientist (born 1934)

- Born: August 10, 1934 (age 92); New York City
- Education: Rockefeller University; Amherst College
- Scientific career
- Fields: Biochemistry
- Institutions: Brookhaven National Laboratory, University of São Paulo

Lewis Joel Greene (born August 10, 1934) is an American Brazilian biochemist, scientist, university professor and editor of the Brazilian Journal of Medical and Biological Research.

Greene received a BA in liberal arts from Amherst College in 1955 and a PhD in biochemistry and cell biology at Rockefeller University in 1962. After his doctorate, he went to work for 12 years as a tenured researcher in the department of biology at Brookhaven National Laboratory. Upon an invitation to become a visiting scientist as a Fulbright scholar for a year at the department of pharmacology of the Faculty of Medicine of Ribeirão Preto of the University of São Paulo (USP) in 1968, Greene and his family decided to return and stay in the country in 1974 and was hired as a professor at the same school, where he is a full professor of cell and molecular biology and head of the Center for Protein Chemistry of Hemocentro de Ribeirão Preto. Greene has trained more than 40 masters and doctoral students and postdoctoral researchers, and has written more than 100 papers in peer-reviewed journals.

Among several honors, he was inducted into the Brazilian Order of Scientific Merit in 2004. He was also a founder and president of the Brazilian Association of Scientific Editors.

== Selected publications ==
- Greene, L. J.; Camargo, A. C. M.; Krieger, E. M.; Stewart, J. M.; Ferreira, S. H. (1972). "Inhibition of the conversion of angiotensin I to II and potentiation of bradykinin by small peptides present in Bothrops jararaca venom". Circ. Res. 31 (9): 62–71. PMID 4341481.
- Beuhler, R. J.; Flanigan, E.; Greene, L. J.; Friedman, L. (1974). "Proton transfer mass spectrometry of peptides. A rapid heating technique for underivatized peptides containing arginine". J. Am. Chem. Soc. 96 (12): 3990–3999. Bibcode:1974JAChS..96.3990B. doi:10.1021/ja00819a043. PMID 4853929.
- Freitas, O.; Padovan, G. J.; Vilela, L.; Dos Santos, J. E.; Dutra de Oliveira, J. D.; Greene, L. J. (1993). "Characterization of protein hydrolysates prepared for enteral nutrition". Journal of Agricultural and Food Chemistry. 41 (9): 1432–1438. Bibcode:1993JAFC...41.1432D. doi:10.1021/jf00033a015.
- Almeida Oliveira, M. G.; Rogana, E.; Rosa, J. C.; Reinhold, B. B.; Andrade, M. H.; Greene, L. J.; Mares Guia, M. (1993). "Tyrosine 151 is part of the substrate activation binding site of bovine trypsin: identification by covalent labelling with p-diazoniumbensamidine and kinetic characterization of Tyr-151 (p-benzamidino)-azo-β-trypsin". J. Biol. Chem. 268 (36): 26893–26903. doi:10.1016/S0021-9258(19)74195-7. PMID 8262923.
- Rosa, J. C.; Oliveira, P. S. L.; Garratt, R. C.; Beltramini, L. M.; Resing, K.; Roque-Barreira, M. C.; Greene, L. J. (1999). "KM+, a mannose-binding lectin from Artocarpus inegrifolia: amino acid sequence predicted tertiary structure, carbohydrate recognition and analysis of the β-prism fold". Protein Science. 8 (1): 13–24. doi:10.1110/ps.8.1.13. PMC 2144112. PMID 10210179.
- Ward, R. J.; Oliveira, A. H. C.; Bortoleto, R. K.; Rosa, J. C.; Faça, V.; Greene, L. J. (2001). "Expression and the purification of a disulphide rich protein in a hydrophobic resin environment, bothropstoxin-I, a Lys49-phospholipase A2 homologue". Protein Expression and Purification. 21 (1): 134–140. doi:10.1006/prep.2000.1353. PMID 11162398. S2CID 20875971.
