= Renato Migliorini =

Brazilian scientist (1926–2008)

Renato Helios Migliorini (June 26, 1926 in Jaú – January 16, 2008 in Ribeirão Preto, Brazil) was a Brazilian physician, biomedical scientist, biochemist and full professor of physiology at the Medical School of Ribeirão Preto of the University of São Paulo.

Migliorini graduated from the Faculty of Medicine of the University of São Paulo in 1949. He obtained a doctorate with his animal research work on the role of estrogens in diabetes. In 1953, he was hired as full-time instructor in the recently founded Department of Physiology of the Faculty of Medicine of Ribeirão Preto, where he worked until very shortly before his death at 82 years of age. He did his postdoctoral studies at UCLA on a scholarship from the Rockefeller Foundation from 1959 to 1960.

== Academic work ==
As a researcher, Dr. Migliorini had a strong focus on the physiology of the endocrine system and biochemical physiology, and within this framework established a strong and active laboratory, which explored many areas, such as neural regulation of fatty acids and glucose, the effects of fasting and feeding on metabolism of brown adipose tissue and liver functions, the protein metabolism in skeletal muscle, the interactions of dietary protein and glucose in glycolysis in adipose tissue, exposure to cold and drugs, as well as the role and function of gluconeogenesis in strictly carnivorous animals, such as vultures. He published more than a hundred papers in noted international journals, particularly in the American Journal of Physiology. He was one of the most cited Brazilian biomedical researchers.

He was nominated a Commander of the Brazilian Order of Scientific Merit and a member of the Brazilian Academy of Sciences, among other distinctions and awards.

Among his many administrative duties in the university, Migliorini was the deputy director of the Medical School and Dean of the Faculty of Philosophy, Sciences and Letters of Ribeirão Preto (FFCLRP) of the University of São Paulo.

== Personal life ==
Dr. Migliorini had, in his lifetime, many collaborators and graduate students, such as Isis do Carmo Kettelhut, José Antunes Rodrigues, José Ernesto dos Santos, Itamar Vugman, Cecil Linder, George Gross, Ingrid Dick de Paula, Vera Lúcia Teixeira, Cesar Timo-Iaria, André Ricciardi Cruz, Cássio Botura and Miguel Rolando Covian, among many others.

In his personal life, Renato Migliorini was married since 1953 with Emilia Blat Migliorini. He left four children, Renato Blat Migliorini, Maria Cecília Blat Migliorini, Vera Lúcia Blat Migliorini and Valéria Blat Migliorini; and five grandchildren; Ramon Migliorini, Marilia Migliorini de Oliveira Lima, Matheus Migliorini de Oliveira Lima, Laura Migliorini Muniz and Bruna Migliorini Muniz.
