= Dr. Krieger =

Dr. Krieger may refer to:

- Dr. Algernop Krieger, a character from Archer
- Eduardo Krieger, Brazilian physician
- Dr. Krieger, the primary antagonist of Far Cry.
