= Hélio Lourenço de Oliveira =

Brazilian physician (1917–1985)

Hélio Lourenço de Oliveira during his time as professor of internal medicine at Faculdade de Medicina de Ribeirão Preto.

Hélio Lourenço de Oliveira (July 9, 1917, Porto Ferreira, Brazil – March 14, 1985, Ribeirão Preto, Brazil) was a Brazilian physician and academic.

Hélio Lourenço de Oliveira was a professor of Internal medicine and acting President (Reitor) of the University of São Paulo between October, 8th, 1968 and April, 29th, 1969. During his short tenure as head of the University of São Paulo, he actively pursued university reforms, repealed the repression of students by police forces and objected the arbitrary political persecution within the university enforced by the military regime who ruled the country.

Forced out of the university by an arbitrary governmental decree, Oliveira moved with part of his family to Alexandria, Egypt, where he lived and worked for the World Health Organization and the UNESCO until 1972.

Back to Ribeirão Preto, Brazil, he resumed his medical activities and was reintegrated to the University of São Paulo in 1980, being elected dean of the Medicine School of Ribeirão Preto in 1983.

Received a posthumous tribute by the University of São Paulo when he was integrated to the hall of its former Presidents.
