= Renato M. E. Sabbatini =

Brazilian scientist (born 1947)

Renato Marcos Endrizzi Sabbatini
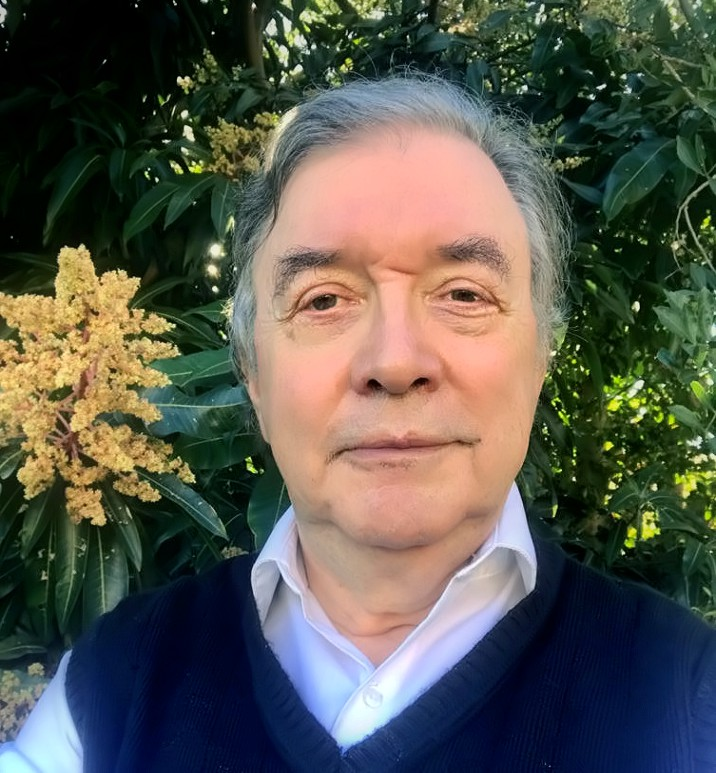
- Born: 20 February 1947 (age 79); Campinas, São Paulo, Brazil
- Education: University of São Paulo; Faculdade de Medicina de Ribeirão Preto
- Awards: Prêmio José Reis de Divulgação Científica
- Scientific career
- Fields: Biomedical Science; Neuroethology; Neurophysiology; Medical Informatics; Telemedicine; Distance education Electromagnetic Fields and Health
- Workplaces: State University of Campinas; Instituto Edumed para Educação em Medicina e Saúde
- Doctoral advisor: Maria Carmela Lico

Renato Marcos Endrizzi Sabbatini (born 20 February 1947, Campinas) is a retired professor at the University of Campinas School of Medical Sciences (Department of Medical Genetics, Division of Medical Informatics and collaborating professor at the Department of Biomedical Engineering the Faculdade de Engenharia Elétrica e Computação da State University of Campinas. He received a B.Sc. in Biomedical Sciences from Medical School of the University of São Paulo and a doctorate in behavioral neurophysiology in 1977, followed by postdoctoral work at the Max Planck Institute of Psychiatry's Primate Behavior Department. He founded the Center for Biomedical Informatics, and helped create the Brazilian Society for Health Informatics.

Sabbatini received several career awards, including the 1992 Prêmio José Reis de Divulgação Científica award for popular science writing, and was named one of Info Exame Magazine's "50 Champions of Innovation" for 2007. He was the founder and president of the Edumed Institute for Education in Medicine and Health, a "not-for-profit educational, research and development institution."

Sabbatini is a Fellow Elect (Inaugural Class) of the International Academy of Health Sciences Informatics, established by the International Medical Informatics Association (IMIA), and a Fellow Elect of the American College of Medical Informatics, established by the American Medical Informatics Association.

== Selected publications ==
- Sabbatini, R.M.E.: A multilayered neural network for processing 2D tomographic images in neurosurgery. Proceed. Nuclear Science Symposium and Medical Imaging Conference, IEEE, 1992
- Ortiz, J.; Ghefter, C.G.; Silva, C.E.; Sabbatini, R.M.E. (Dec 1995). "One-year mortality prognosis in heart failure: a neural network approach based on echocardiographic data". J Am Coll Cardiol. 26 (7): 1586–93. doi:10.1016/0735-1097(95)00385-1. PMID 7594090.
- Sabbatini, R.M.E.; Cardoso, S.H.: The Virtual Hospital, Electronic Publications and the Visible Human: New Paradigms for Health Education. Proceed. Regional Conference on Health Information Systems, p. 128–137, São Paulo, BIREME, 1996. (In Portuguese)
- Sabbatini, R.M.E. (Mar–Apr 1996). "Using neural networks for processing biologic signals". MD Comput. 13 (2): 165–172. PMID 8684280.
- Da Costa, C.G.A.; Sabbatini, R.M.E. (2001). "A Survey of Software Engineering Practices in the Development of Electronic Patient Record Systems" (PDF). Proceed. AMIA Annu. Meet.: 851. PMC 2243315.
- Cardoso, S.H.; Sabbatini, R.M.E.: "Brain & Mind" Magazine: An On-Line Multimedia Resource for Dissemination and Evaluation of Knowledge in Neuroscience. Proceed. AMIA Annu. Meet. (In PDF)
- Carvalho, P.M.; Sabbatini, R.M.E. (2001). "Integrating the Teaching of Informatics to Medical Students in a Problem-Based Learning Undergraduate Course" (PDF). Proceed. AMIA Annu. Meet.: 873. PMC 2243634.
- Botelho, M.L.; Araújo, L.; Sabbatini, R.M.E.: A Neural-Network Based System on the World Wide Web for Prognosis and Indication of Surgery in Head and Brain Trauma. Proceed. AMIA Annu. Meet., 1997 (In PDF)
- Quaresma, R.P.; Sabbatini, R.M.E.; Cardoso, S.H.; Ortale, J.R.: Adding Java and CGI Functionality to an On-Line Atlas of Anatomy for Medical Education. Proceed. AMIA Annu. Meet., 1997 (In PDF)
- Palombo, C.R. Maccari-Filho, M.; Sabbatini, R.M.E. and Halstead, C.L.: The Virtual Dental Center: Resource for Research and Education on the WWW. Proceed. AMIA Annu. Meet., 1997 (In PDF)
- Sabbatini, R.M.E.; Cardoso, S.H.: Interdisciplinarity and the Neurosciences. Interdisciplinary Science Reviews, 27(4) Dec 2002, pp. 303–311.
- Sabbatini, R.M.E.; Cardoso, S.H.: Internet-2 Based Tele/Videoconferencing for Distance Medical Education: The EduMed. Net Project. AMIA Annual Meeting
- Cardoso, S.H.; Sabbatini, R.M.E.: On-line Resources for a WWW-based Continued Education Curriculum on Behavioral Neurobiology. AMIA Annual Meeting (in PDF).
- Sabbatini, R.M.E.: The Brazilian Virtual Hospital. A Case in e-Health. In: Knight, P. et al.: e-Democracy in Brazil. Rio de Janeiro: Pearson Educational, 2003. (In Portuguese).
- Sabbatini, R.M.E. & Cardoso, S.H.: A Distance Interactive Course on the History of Neuroscience. Abstr. Annu. Meet. Soc. Neurosci. (SFN 2003), New Orleans, LA, USA, Nov. 2003.
- Lopes da Silva, J.V.; Santa Bárbara, A.; Cardoso, S.H.; Sabbatini, R.M.E. and Coimbra, N.C.: Construction of 3D Anatomical Models in Polymer Using Selective Laser Sintering – A New Method for Teaching Human Anatomy, Proc. VIII International Conference on Nursing Informatics. Rio de Janeiro, June 2003.
- Sabbatini, R.M.E. Internet Health Applications in Brazil. In: Sosa-Iudicissa, M. et al. (Eds). Internet, Telematics and Health. IOP Press, 1997. Excerpt at Google Books
- Sabbatini, R.M.E. – Applications of connectionist systems in Biomedicine. In: Lun, K.C.; Degoulet, P. & Piemme, T. (Eds.) – Proceed. 7th World Congress on Medical Informatics (MEDINFO 92). p. 418–425, 1992.
- Sabbatini, RM (April 1982). "A head-mounted stereotaxic platform with movable electrodes for intracerebral exploration". Braz. J. Med. Biol. Res. 15: 65–71. PMID 6758889.
