= Sérgio Henrique Ferreira =

Brazilian physician and pharmacologist (1934–2016)

- Born: October 4, 1934; Franca, São Paulo, Brazil
- Died: July 17, 2016 (aged 81); Ribeirão Preto, São Paulo, Brazil
- Education: Faculdade de Medicina de Ribeirão Preto, University of São Paulo
- Known for: Discovery of the bradykinin potentiating factor
- Awards: TWAS Prize (Third World Academy of Sciences); Premio México de Ciencia y Tecnología (1999)
- Scientific career
- Fields: Physician, pharmacologist
- Workplaces: Faculty of Medicine of Ribeirão Preto of the University of São Paulo

Sérgio Henrique Ferreira (October 4, 1934 – July 17, 2016) was a Brazilian physician and pharmacologist noted for the discovery of the bradykinin potentiating factor, which led to new and widely used anti-hypertension drugs — the ACE inhibitors.

== Biography ==
Ferreira received his M.D. from the Faculty of Medicine of Ribeirão Preto of the University of São Paulo (USP) and soon became staff member of the same school, where he was a member of the Department of Pharmacology. His research training in pharmacology initiated in this Department with Prof. Maurício Rocha e Silva, the discoverer of bradykinin. While working on this subject, he discovered a family of peptides present in the venom of a Brazilian snake, Bothrops jararaca, which inhibited kininase activity and strongly potentiated the effects of bradykinin in vivo and in vitro. This factor was named bradykinin potentiating factor, BPF. In 1968, with the collaboration of Dr. Lewis Joel Greene, from the Brookhaven National Laboratory, U.S., he isolated several pharmacologically active peptides responsible for the activity of BPF. Using those peptides, was demonstrated a general parallelism between bradykinin potentiation and inhibition of Angiotensin I conversion. Subsequently, his group elucidated the structure of the smallest peptide, and using the synthetic pentapeptide, demonstrated its ability to potentiate bradykinin and to inhibit the conversion of angiotensin I in vivo in experimental models of hypertension. His work in this area paved the way for the development of a new class of antihypertensive drugs, the angiotensin converting enzyme (ACE) inhibitors by Squibb scientists. For this work with the Bothrops peptide he received the CIBA Award for Hypertension Research of 1983, together with Drs. E. Ondetti and D. Cushman from Squibb laboratories.

While working in London in the early 1970s with John R. Vane (Nobel Prize in Medicine, 1983), he participated in the discovery of the inhibition of the synthesis of prostaglandins by aspirin-like drugs. At that time, he proposed that the mechanism of the analgesic action of nonsteroidal anti-inflammatory drugs (NSAIDs) was due to the prevention of pain receptor sensitization which results from an inhibition of the synthesis of prostaglandins. This hypothesis was supported by further work from his laboratory and from many other investigators. His studies on the basic mechanisms involved in the development of inflammatory hyperalgesia led to the discovery that a select class of analgesics like metamizole, in contrast to the classical NSAIDs, are able to counteract the ongoing sensitization of the primary sensory neuron via the stimulation of the arginine/nitric oxide pathway. He characterized a phenomenon described as retrograde sensitization of the primary sensory neuron, which emphasizes the importance of the peripheral component of the inflammatory pain. His group made a relevant contribution to the role of bradykinin and of cytokines in the development of inflammatory hyperalgesia. He found that among the cytokines, interleukin 1b mediates the endogenous release of prostaglandins and IL-8 is responsible for the development of the sympathetic hyperalgesia. In this area he described an antagonist of IL-1 that is now being developed as a model for a new class of analgesics.

== Awards and accolades ==
Ferreira's contributions to science are extensively recognized. In 1995, he received the National Order of Scientific Merit in the Great Cross level, and received several awards and medals, such as the TWAS Prize from the Third World Academy of Sciences (1990 and 1992), the Mexican Prize of Science and Technology (1999), the Rheimboldt-Hauptmann Prize of the University of São Paulo (2001) and the Péter Murányi Prize (2002). He was in the editorial board of several international journals, was foreign member of the U.S. National Academy of Sciences. Ferreira was also a noted scientific leader in Brazil. He helped to found and is one of the editors-in-chief of the most influential international biomedical scientific journal, Brazilian Journal of Medical and Biological Research, was a member of the Brazilian National Academy of Sciences and of the Brazilian Council of Science and Technology. He was founder and past president of the Brazilian Society for Pharmacology and Therapeutics and of the Brazilian Society for the Progress of Science (SBPC).

== Bibliography ==
- Ferreira, S. H. 1972. Prostaglandins, aspirin-like drugs and analgesia. Nature New Biology. vol. 240, p. 200-203.
- Ferreira, S. H. and Nakamura, M. 1979. II-Prostaglandins hyperalgesia: the peripheral analgesic activity of morphine, enkephalins and opioid antagonists. Prostaglandins. vol. 18, p. 191-200.
- Ferreira, S. H., et al. 1988. Interleukin-1b as a potent hyperalgesic agent antagonized by a tripeptide analogue. Nature. vol. 334, p. 698-700.
- Ferreira, S. H., et al. 1991. The molecular mechanism of action of peripheral morphine analgesia: stimulation of cGMP system via nitric oxide release. European Journal of Pharmacology. vol. 201, p. 121-122.
- Ferreira, S. H., et al. 1993. Bradykinin initiates cytokine mediated inflammatory hyperalgesia. Brazilian Journal of Pharmacological Sciences. vol. 110, p. 1227-1231.
- Ferreira, S. H. and Lorenzetti, B. B. 1994. Glutamate spinal retrograde sensitization of primary sensory neurons associated with nociception. Neuropharmacology. vol. 33, no. 11, p. 1479-1485.

== Sources ==
- Adapted from Sérgio Henrique Ferreira Biography. Brazilian Academy of Sciences.
