= Cerro Largo, Rio Grande do Sul =

Municipality in Brazil

- Municipality
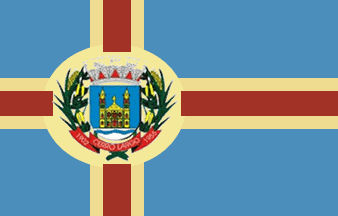
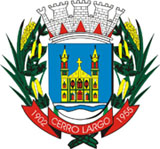
- Flag Coat of arms
- Interactive map of Cerro Largo, Rio Grande do Sul
- Country: Brazil
- Time zone: UTC−3 (BRT)

Cerro Largo is a municipality in the northwestern part of the Brazilian state of Rio Grande do Sul. It occupies an area of 174.64 km^{2} (67.43 sq mi) at 28º09'0" south 54º45'0" west, at an elevation of 211 m (692 ft) above sea level. Its population as of 2020 was 14,189 inhabitants.

== Regional language ==
Cerro Largo was settled soon after 1900 mostly by German Brazilians from the old German settlements on the eastern part of the state of Rio Grande do Sul, the Altkolonie (in German). Portuguese is the official language but Riograndenser Hunsrückisch is still spoken by many citizens in the area. It is the birthplace of São Paulo's current archbishop, Cardinal Odilo Scherer. In 2012 the state chamber of deputies voted unanimously in favor of recognizing this Germanic dialect an official historical culture good to be preserved.

== Notable people ==
- Eduardo Moacyr Krieger (born 1928), physician and physiologist

== See also ==
- German Brazilians
- List of municipalities in Rio Grande do Sul
