= Marco Antonio Zago =

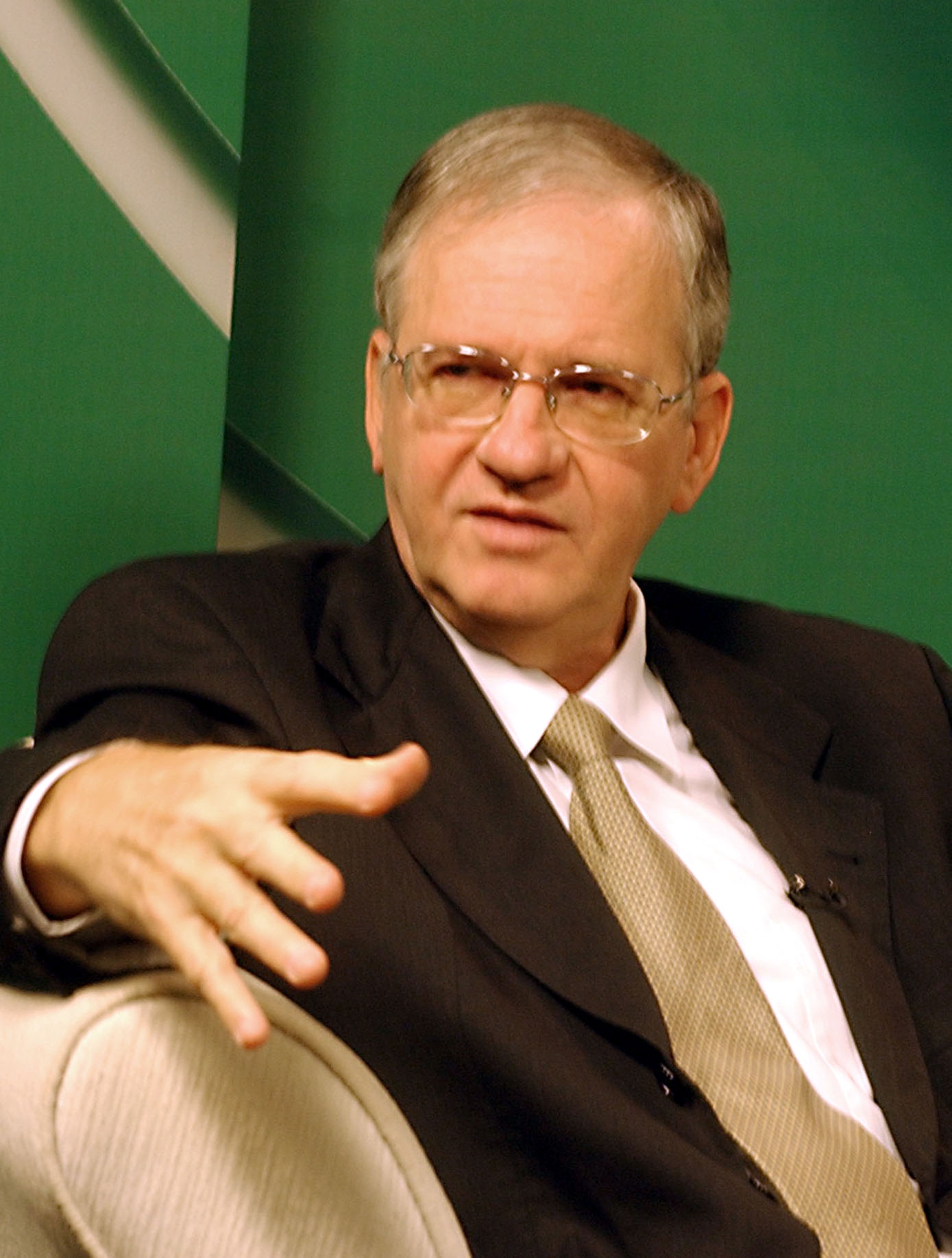
Marco Antonio Zago

Marco Antonio Zago (born January 11, 1946, in Birigüi, São Paulo) is a Brazilian physician and prominent medical scientist, who is active in the fields of hereditary diseases of the blood (hemoglobins, clotting, thrombosis), molecular basis of cancer and human population genetics. Aside from working directly as scientes, he has been president of the Brazilian National Research Council (CNPq) and dean of the University of São Paulo. He's now the president of the São Paulo Research Foundation (Fapesp).

Dr. Zago graduated in Medicine from the School of Medicine of Ribeirão Preto of the University of São Paulo in 1970, where he received the M.Sc. degree in medicine (1973) and the Ph.D. degree (1975), under the supervision of Professor Cássio Bottura, one of the most outstanding Brazilian hematologist and cytogeneticist.

After his post-doctoral training at the Oxford University, in the laboratories of Professor Sir David J. Wetherall, whose group was at the time establishing the molecular bases of the thalassemias, he returned to Brazil and started a research group with a major scientific interest in the genetic bases of hematological diseases.

This group soon attracted attention with the following achievements, among others:

- Demonstrated that the residual amount of HbF produced in adults is genetically determined. The molecular bases for this inheritance are complex, involving at least three loci, and are of importance for the treatment of hereditary anemias.
- Identified for the first time in the country and described the genetic, the biochemical and the clinical features of several structural defects of hemoglobins and thalassemia variants, including a point mutation in the promoter region of the gamma globin gene responsible for the Brazilian form of HbF persistence.
- Identified molecular defects in hemophilias
- Identified a mutation of the LDL-r gene that is responsible for most of the cases of familial hypercholesterolemia in Brazil.
- Revealed an until then unsuspected heterogeneity of the blood group O gene (from the ABO blood group), showing that the group O variants have a heterogeneous ethnic distribution and identified the molecular basis of this diversity, describing at least seven new molecular variants of the blood group O gene.
- Studied the contribution of genetic factors to the origin of thrombosis, including the role of mutations of several genes, related or not to the blood coagulation system. One mutation of especial interest involves de coagulation factor XIII and protects against the occurrence of arterial thrombosis.
- Studied the population genetics and physical anthropology of Brazilian populations, especially the Amerindians and the Blacks. On the basis of DNA markers linked to the sickle cell anemia gene, he demonstrated that the Brazilian black population is predominantly of Bantu origin, with a lesser contribution from the Benin and very little contribution from the Senegambia. These data demonstrated that this Black population is significantly different from its U.S. or Caribbean counterparts, with implications for the medical genetic studies that compare these populations and for the understanding of the hereditary diseases. Furthermore, his studies on markers linked to the mitochondrial DNA, the Y chromosome, several nuclear genes and VNTRs have contributed to the understanding of the genetic diversity of the Amerindian populations, the relationship with the founder populations, and the black Brazilian populations. His laboratory and his collaborators have contributed the largest volume of data on DNA markers in the Brazilian populations thus far.

As a medical academic, Dr. Zago has supervised ca. 20 PhD or MSc theses, and most of his former graduate students are now researchers in different universities. Apart from his research group in Ribeirão Preto, his students have founded two other prominent research nuclei of human population genetics (in Belém, Pará) and hematology (in Campinas). He participates in two consortia coordinated by FAPESP, a science foundation in the State of S. Paulo, and the Ludwig Institute for Cancer Research (LICR): the sequencing of the Xylella fastidiosa genome, the first phytopathogen whose genome was completely sequenced, and the FAPESP/LICR Human Cancer Genome Project, that studied the gene expression in human neoplastic tissues, and generated one of the largest contributions of gene expression to public databases.

Dr. Zago is a member of the Brazilian Academy of Sciences and holds a Commend of the Brazilian Order of Scientific Merit presented by the Presidency of the Republic in August 2000.

== Sources ==
- Adapted from the official biography at the Brazilian Academy of Sciences, by permission of the biographed.
