= Eichgraben =

- Municipality
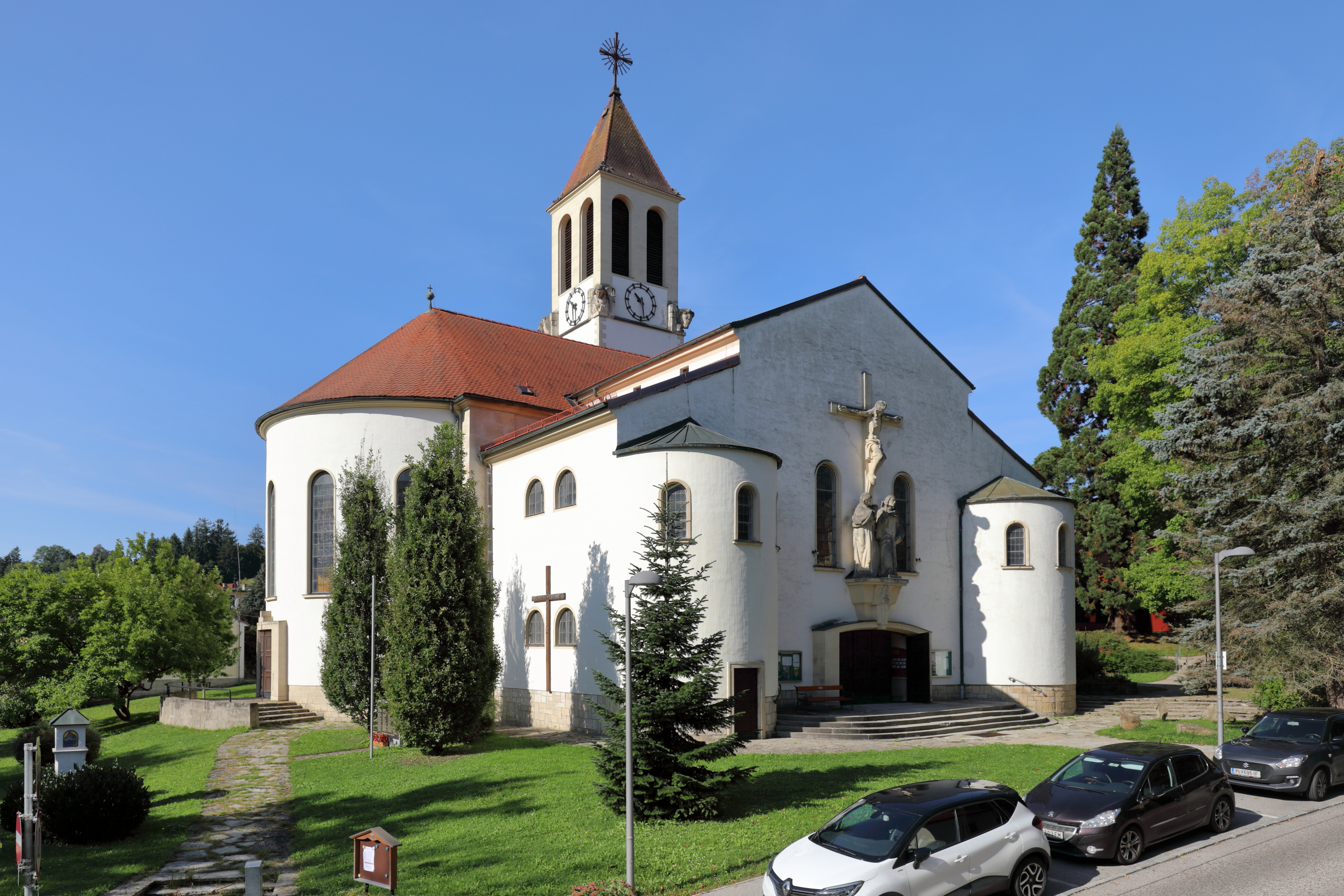
- Roman Catholic Heart of Jesus Peace Church in Eichgraben named "Duomo of Vienna Woods"

- Coat of arms

- Location within Austria
- Coordinates: 48°10′22″N 15°59′0″E
- Country: Austria
- State: Lower Austria
- District: Sankt Pölten-Land

Government
  - Mayor: Georg Ockermüller
- Elevation: 286 m (938 ft)

Population (2018-01-01)
  - Total: 4,614
- Time zone: UTC+1 (CET)
  - Summer (DST): UTC+2 (CEST)
- Postal code: 3032
- Area code: 02773
- Website: http://www.eichgraben.at

Eichgraben is a town in the district of Sankt Pölten-Land in the Austrian state of Lower Austria.

== Geography ==
=== Populated places ===
The municipality of Eichgraben consists of the following cadastral communities: Eichgraben; while further subdivided into populated places (with population in brackets as of 1 January 2024).

- Eichgraben (250)
- Hinterleiten (1361)
- Hutten (1477)
- Ottenheim (961)
- Stein (631)
- Winkl (113)

== Population ==
Historical population
Year	Pop.	±%
1794	346	—
1830	354	+2.3%
1869	578	+63.3%
1880	583	+0.9%
1890	636	+9.1%
1900	874	+37.4%
1910	1,303	+49.1%
1923	1,380	+5.9%
1934	1,737	+25.9%
1939	1,822	+4.9%
1951	2,118	+16.2%
1961	2,050	−3.2%
1971	2,321	+13.2%
1981	2,642	+13.8%
1991	3,344	+26.6%
2001	3,748	+12.1%
2011	4,353	+16.1%
2021	4,783	+9.9%

== Notable people ==
- Fritz Köberle (1910–1983), Austrian-Brazilian physician, pathologist and scientist
