= Brazilian Journal of Medical and Biological Research =

- Discipline: Biology, medicine
- Language: English
- Edited by: Eduardo Magalhães Rego, Luisa Lina Villa, João Pereira Leite, Roberto César Pereira Lima Júnior, Itamar de Souza Santos, Claudia Kimie Suemoto

Publication details
- Former name: Revista Brasileira de Pesquisas Médicas e Biológicas
- History: 1968–present
- Publisher: Associação Brasileira de Divulgação Científica (Brazil)
- Frequency: continuous
- Open access: Yes
- License: Creative Commons Attribution License
- Impact factor: 2.590 (2020)

Standard abbreviations
- ISO 4: Braz. J. Med. Biol. Res.

Indexing
- ISSN: 0100-879X (print); 1414-431X (web)
- LCCN: 75615076
- OCLC no.: 476951883

Links
- Journal homepage; Online archive

The Brazilian Journal of Medical and Biological Research is a peer-reviewed open-access scientific journal in the fields of biology and medicine, edited and published monthly by the Associação Brasileira de Divulgação Científica (ABDC), a federation of Brazilian scientific societies comprising:

- Sociedade Brasileira de Biofísica
- Sociedade Brasileira de Farmacologia e Terapêutica Experimental
- Sociedade Brasileira de Fisiologia
- Sociedade Brasileira de Imunologia
- Sociedade Brasileira de Investigação Clínica
- Sociedade Brasileira de Neurociências e Comportamento

It is now published as part of the Scientific Electronic Library (SciELO) project.

== History ==
The journal was established in 1968 by Michel Jamra as Revista Brasileira de Pesquisas Médicas e Biológicas, published in Portuguese. It obtained its current title in 1981, when ABDC assumed its publication, accepting papers in English only. The initial editors-in-chief were Lewis Joel Greene, Eduardo Moacyr Krieger, and Sérgio Henrique Ferreira (Faculty of Medicine of Ribeirão Preto). Of the original three, only Greene remains as editor.

== Abstracting and indexing ==
The journal is abstracted and indexed in:

- MEDLINE
- Index Medicus
- Science Citation Index
- SciELO
- Current Contents/Life Sciences
- Biological Abstracts
- Excerpta Medica
- PsycINFO
- LILACS
