= Faculdade de Filosofia, Ciências e Letras de Ribeirão Preto =

Liberal arts college of the University of São Paulo in São Paulo, Brazil

- Faculdade de Filosofia, Ciências e Letras de Ribeirão Preto
- FFCLRP logo featuring an owl
- Motto: Experientia Fides Nostra
- Type: Public
- Established: 1959; 67 years ago
- Parent institution: University of São Paulo
- Director: Pietro Ciancaglini
- Faculty: 203
- Administrative staff: 207
- Undergraduates: 2693
- Postgraduates: 620
- Location: Ribeirão Preto, Brazil
- Website: http://www.ffclrp.usp.br

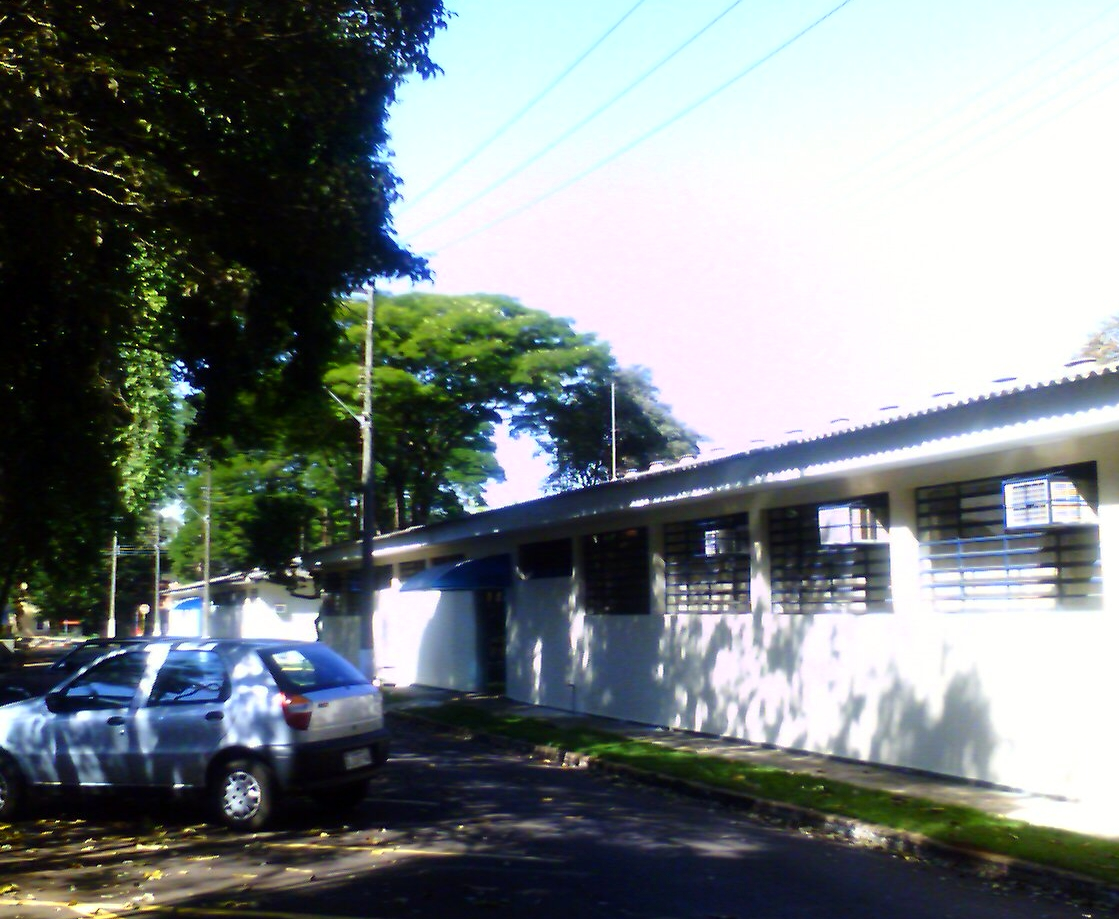
Some of the buildings in the FFCLRP facilities

The Faculdade de Filosofia, Ciências e Letras de Ribeirão Preto (abbreviated FFCLRP, and also known as Filô), is a unity of the University of São Paulo located in Ribeirão Preto, São Paulo, Brazil. It was created in 1959 and incorporated into the university in 1974.

The school offers undergraduate courses (bachelor's and licentiate degrees) in several different areas such as visual arts education, biology, chemistry, health informatics, library and information sciences, medical physics, mathematics applied to business, computer science, music, pedagogy and psychology. It also offers graduate programs in areas such as applied computing, chemistry, comparative biology, education, entomology, physics applied to biology and medicine, psychobiology, and psychology.

== History ==
The FFCLRP was created by a decree of the State Government of São Paulo in October 1959, and its first activities began in March 1964. The official and definitive authorization came two years later, with a second governmental decree published in May 1966. Eventually, it was incorporated into the University of São Paulo in 1974.

The Biology, Psychology and Chemistry courses began in 1964, in collaboration with the Medical School of Ribeirão Preto (FMRP), one of the medical schools of the University of São Paulo. The FMRP provided not only rooms for the operation of the courses, but it also provided staff and professors. The first director of the FFCLRP was Dr. Lucien Lison, a medical professor. Later, the FFCLRP built its own premises in Ribeirão Preto, which currently occupy an area of 40,499.59 m^{2}.

Two characteristics were noteworthy at the beginning of the FFCLRP activities: the Propedeutic Cycle and the Course Conclusion Monograph. The Propedeutic Cycle was a one-year course comprising academic disciplines common to all courses. At the end of this cycle, each student could choose their respective area of specialty. There was already a concern at that time with the basic interdisciplinary training of students, which would have a strong influence on their future research work. The students' preparation for scientific research was the second outstanding characteristic of the FFCLRP. Until 1971, students were required to develop research guided by one of the school professors. The results of these guided research activities were presented in the form of a monograph. Although the monograph was discontinued from the curricular structure as of 1972, the departments of Biology, Psychology, and Education still maintain it as a requirement for the awarding of bachelor's or licentiate's degrees. In the Chemistry Department, the monograph was replaced by a 240-hour compulsory internship.

In 2010, the University Council of the University of São Paulo approved the restructuring of the Departments of the FFCLRP, which included the incorporation of the Department of Music, adding to a total of seven departments.

=== Former directors ===
- Lucien Alphonse Joseph Lison (1963–1969)
- Otávio Baracchini (1968-1968)
- Geraldo Garcia Duarte (1978–1972)
- André Ricciardi Cruz (1972–1976)
- Renato Hélios Migliorini (1977–1981)
- Ernesto Giesbrecht (1981–1984)
- Ronaldo Zucchi (1984–1988)
- André Jacquemin (1988–1992)
- Lionel Segui Gonçalves (1992–1996)
- José Aparecido da Silva (1996–2000)
- Oswaldo Baffa Filho (2000–2004)
- Francisco de Assis Leone (2004–2008)
- Sebastião de Sousa Almeida (2008–2012)
- Fernando Luis Medina Mantelatto (2012–2016)

== Departments ==
Currently, the FFCLRP comprises ten departments: Biology, Chemistry, Computer Science and Mathematics, Education, Information and Communication, Music, Psychology, and Physics. These Departments award bachelor's and licenciate degrees in Biology, Psychology, Pedagogy and Chemistry, as well as Information and Documentation, Medical Physics, Biomedical Informatics, Mathematics applied to Business, Technological Chemistry, Biotechnology and Agroindustry, Chemistry, Forensic Chemistry, Psychology, Artistic Education, and Music.

== Undergraduate courses ==
The following Bachelor's and Licentiate degree courses are offered:

- Arts education
- Biology
- Chemistry (general, environmental, forensics and technical chemistry)
- Computer science
- Health informatics
- Library and information sciences
- Medical Physics
- Mathematics applied to Business
- Music (with distinct courses for singing and lyrical arts and musical instruments)
- Pedagogy
- Psychology

== Graduate programs ==
FFCLRP has also an extensive graduate school, with programs in the following areas:

- Applied computing
- Chemistry
- Comparative biology
- Education
- Entomology
- Physics applied to Biology and Medicine
- Psychobiology
- Psychology

== Associated facilities ==
There are several research laboratories and community outreach centers affiliated to FFCLRP, such as:

- Centro de Documentação da Biodiversidade (CDB);
- Centro Brasileiro de Investigações sobre o Desenvolvimento e Educação Infantil (CINDEDI);
- Centro de Ensino Integrado de Química (CEIQ);
- Centro de Instrumentação, Dosimetria e Radioproteção (CIDRA);
- Centro de Psicologia Aplicada (CPA);
- L@ife - Laboratório Interdisciplinar de Formação do Educador;
- Rede SACI - COM.VIVER - Centro de Informação e Convivência.
