= Metachromasia =

Property of chemical biologic staining

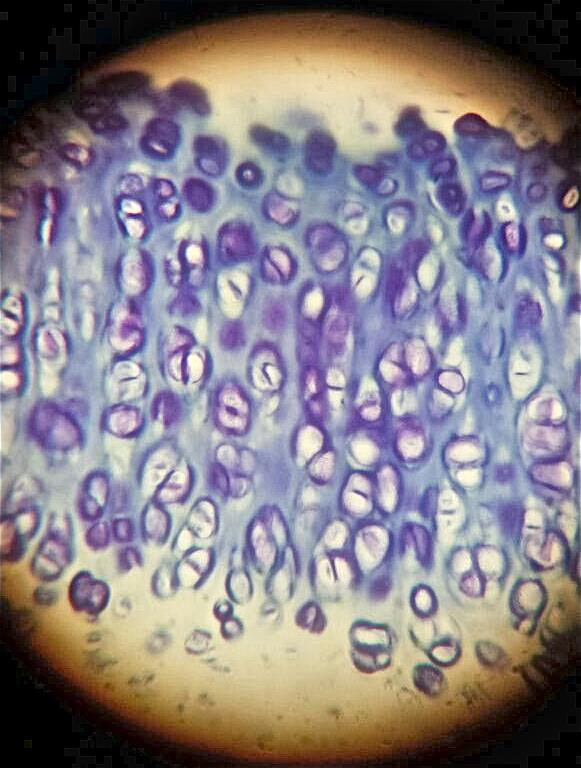
Hyaline cartilage coloured with the toluidine blue: a strong metachromasia of the ground substance can be observed. View through optical microscope, 40x magnification.

Metachromasia (var. metachromasy) is a phenomenon where a biological tissue stains in a different color than the original dye applied. It occurs when dyes bind to tissue substances called chromotropes. For example, toluidine blue becomes dark blue (with a colour range from blue-red dependent on glycosaminoglycan content) when bound to cartilage. Other widely used metachromatic stains include the family of Romanowsky stains that also contain thiazine dyes: the white cell nucleus stains purple, basophil granules intense magenta, whilst the cytoplasm (of mononuclear cells) stains blue, which is called the Romanowsky effect. The absence of color change in staining is named orthochromasia.

The underlying mechanism for metachromasia requires the presence of polyanions within the tissue. When these tissues are stained with a concentrated basic dye solution, such as toluidine blue, the bound dye molecules are close enough to form dimeric and polymeric aggregates. The light absorption spectra of these stacked dye aggregates differ from those of the individual monomeric dye molecules. Cell and tissue structures that have high concentrations of ionized sulfate and phosphate groups—such as the ground substance of cartilage, heparin-containing granules of mast cells, and rough endoplasmic reticulum of plasma cells—exhibit metachromasia. This depends on the charge density of the negative sulfate and carboxylate anions in the glycosaminoglycan (GAG). The GAG polyanion stabilizes the stacked, positively charged dye molecules, resulting in a spectral shift as the conjugated double bond π-orbitals of adjacent dye molecules overlap. The greater the degree of stacking, the greater the metachromatic shift. Thus, hyaluronic acid, lacking sulphate groups and with only moderate charge density, causes slight metachromasia; chondroitin sulfate, with an additional sulfate residue per GAG saccharide dimer, is an effective metachromatic substrate, whilst heparin, with further N-sulfation, is strongly metachromatic. Therefore, toluidine blue will appear purple to red when it stains these components.

The metachromatic properties of dimethylmethylene blue, a thiazine dye closely related to toluidine blue, have been exploited to assay glycosaminoglycans extracted from cartilage and other connective tissues. The absorption peak shifts from about 630 nm (red absorption, therefore blue colour) to about 530 nm in the presence of GAG. Humbel and Etringer's original assay was developed by others to create a stable and widely used dimethylmethylene blue reagent.

Although metachromasia was observed and described since 1875, by Cornil, Ranvier and others, it was the German scientist Paul Ehrlich (1854-1915) who gave its name and studied it more extensively. The modern understanding of metachromasia was advanced by Belgian histologist Lucien Lison, who studied it between 1933 and 1936 and ascertained its value in the quantitative determination of sulfate esters of high molecular weight. He also studied the metachromasia of nucleic acids. More recently, Karlheinz Toepfer published in 1970 spectral shifts with increasing concentration of the thiazine dyes that matched the spectra of dye:heparin mixtures, showing clearly that metachromasia, corresponding to the colour of stained cartilage, could be reproduced by high concentration of the dye alone in solution. Hence, proximity of the dye molecules was the key parameter in defining metachromasia. Another example of metachromatic dye (fluorochrome) is acridine orange. Under certain conditions it stains single-stranded nucleic acids fluorescing red (red luminescence) while when interacts with double stranded nucleic acids gives green fluorescence.
