= University of Campinas School of Medical Sciences =

College in Campinas, São Paulo, Brazil

Coordinates: 22°49′48.49″S 47°03′47.82″W

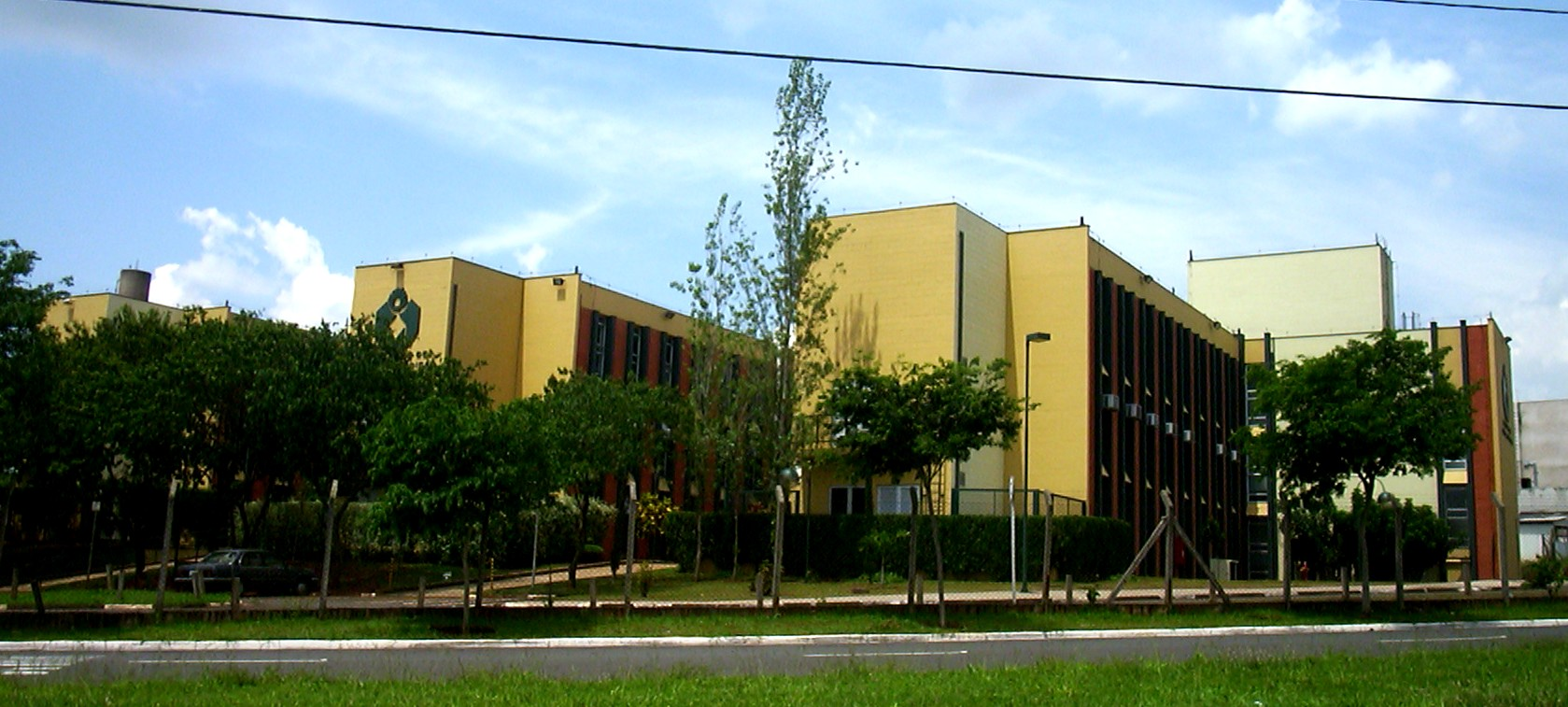
Main buildings, 2005

The School of Medical Sciences (Portuguese: Faculdade de Ciências Médicas, FCM) is a college of the State University of Campinas, located in Campinas, São Paulo, Brazil. It offers courses at the undergraduate level in medicine, nursing, pharmacy and speech therapy, as well as courses at graduate and postgraduate level (specialization, master's, doctorate, and medical residency). Affiliated clinical centers are the Clinics Hospital, the Hospital of Sumaré, the Center for Women Integral Health Care (CAISM), the Gastroenterology Center, the Pediatrics Center, the Haemocenter of Campinas, and several others. It has also a nucleus of experimental medical research. The School is considered one of the foremost Brazilian excellence centers in teaching, research and health care services.

== History ==
The school was created as the Faculdade de Medicina de Campinas on November 25, 1958, by Decree No. 4996 of the state government, but it only began its operations with the first year of the medical course on December 28, 1962, by virtue of Decree No. 7655, when the State University of Campinas was created and the medical school was incorporated to it. Its first location was in a private hospital in the central area of the city, the Maternidade de Campinas, and clinical teaching was carried out in another philanthropic hospital, the Santa Casa de Misericórdia de Campinas. A new Clinics Hospital was built in the central university campus, in the Barão Geraldo subdistrict, and when it was completed, in 1986, the entire school was moved to there. Three new undergraduate professional courses were created in the subsequent years: nursing, speech therapy and pharmacy.

== Figures ==
As of January 2005, the Medical School occupies 14 buildings in a total area of more than 40,000 m². It has a teaching faculty of 358 and more than 4,000 students, distributed as follows: 1030 in its four undergraduate courses, 991 in postgraduate school (991 masters and 482 doctorate) and more than 1,500 in 63 different specialization courses.

Clinical teaching is carried out in the cluster of health care institutions around the medical school, in seven buildings with a total area of 65,000 m^{2}, 403 beds, emergency unit, a surgical center with 16 rooms. The hospital serves ca. 115,000 outpatients, 15,000 surgeries, 150,000 consultations and 1.8 million of lab tests per year, in 44 medical specialties. The hospital has around 3,000 workers.

== Departments ==
- Medical genetics
- Pathological anatomy
- Clinical pathology
- Pharmacology
- Clinical medicine
- Orthopedics
- Psychiatry and medical psychology
- Pediatrics
- Gynecology and obstetrics
- Anesthesiology
- Surgery
- Neurology
- Otorhinolaryngology and Ophthalmology
- Radiology
- Preventive and social medicine
- Nursing

== Notable faculty and students ==
- José Aristodemo Pinotti was departmental chairman, school dean and university dean
- Cássio Raposo do Amaral, plastic surgeon
- Domingo Marcolino Braile, heart surgeon
- Gilberto De Nucci, pharmacologist
- Renato M.E. Sabbatini, medical informatician and neuroscientist
- Bernardo Beiguelman, geneticist
- Antonio Martins Filho, pediatrician, was departmental chairman, school dean and university dean
