= Buenos Aires National Academy of Medicine =

Coordinates: 34°35′02″S 58°24′21″W

Academia Nacional de Medicina de Buenos Aires
- Founded: 1822
- Type: Learned society
- Location: Las Heras 3092, Buenos Aires
- Region served: Argentina
- Members: 370
- Key people: Dr. Juan M. Ghirlanda, president
- Website: www.acamedbai.org.ar

The Buenos Aires National Academy of Medicine is an Argentine non-profit organization and learned society.

== Overview ==
The National Academy of Medicine is the oldest medical Academy in Argentina and was founded in Buenos Aires in 1822, coinciding with the establishment of the University of Buenos Aires School of Medicine. Its establishment was an initiative of Bernardino Rivadavia, Minister of Government and Foreign Relations for Buenos Aires Province Governor Martín Rodríguez.

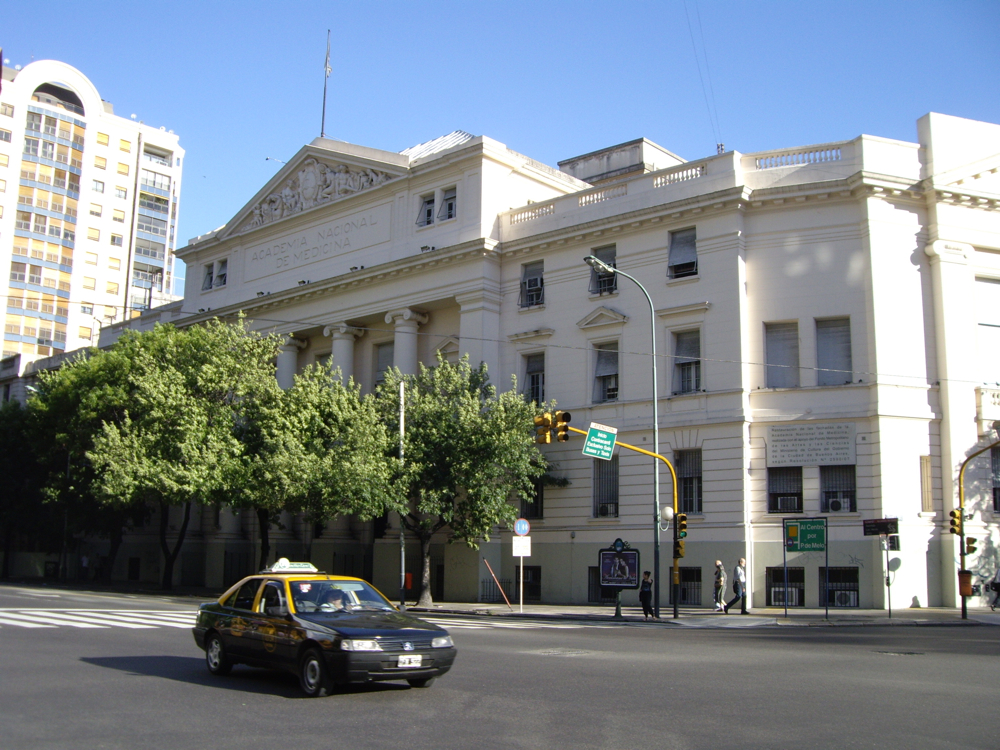
The National Academy of Medicine, on Las Heras Avenue

The academy coordinates research and is consulted on medical matters by government departments, judges, public health officials, and the media. The academy hosts lectures and fosters close contact with national and foreign Academies, and with medical and scientific institutions promoting research. Basic and clinical research projects are coordinated and financed by the Academy in three institutes: the Mariano Castex Institute of Hematology (the largest and best known), and the institutes of Epidemiology and Oncology; prizes and fellowships are awarded annually.

Its numerary membership totals 35 physicians elected by a vote of their peers, all reside in Buenos Aires, and each represents a different field in medicine. The academic tenure is held for life and ad honorem; members who retire become Emeritus Academy Members. Corresponding National and International Academy Members are elected each year on the same basis as full Members, and, including honorary members, totaled 334. Past members have included three Nobel Prize in Medicine laureates: Dr. Bernardo Houssay (1947), Dr. Luis Federico Leloir (1970), and Dr. César Milstein (1984).

The academy's headquarters is a Neoclassical building situated on a corner lot in the upscale Recoleta area of Buenos Aires. Its semi-annual journal, Boletín de la Academia de Medicina de Buenos Aires, was established in 1917, superseding Anales (1823). The Council for Certification of Medical Professionals was established in 1991, and the Academic Council on medical Ethics, in 1999.

== Bibliography ==
- Academia Nacional de Medicina: Actividades (in Spanish)
- Academia Nacional de Medicina: Historia (in Spanish)
