= Gilberto de Nucci =

Brazilian physician and pharmacologist

Gilberto De Nucci (born 18 March 1958, Campinas) is a noted Brazilian physician, scientist and university professor in the field of pharmacology.

== Education ==
He was born in Campinas, state of São Paulo, Brazil. His father was a well-known physician in the city. De Nucci studied medicine at the Medical School of Ribeirão Preto of the University of São Paulo, in Ribeirão Preto (graduating in 1981), where he also did his initial scientific studies in the Department of Pharmacology. Soon after graduation he moved to London, England. He worked from 1982 to 1985 with Dr. John R. Vane, 1982 Nobel Prize in Physiology and Medicine, at the Wellcome Research Laboratories, in London, England. His doctoral studies were conducted at the Royal College of Surgeons, University of London, in 1986, with Prof. Salvador Moncada. From 1986 to 1988 he was senior scientist at Saint Bartholomew's Hospital Medical College, William Harvey Research Institute.

== Roles in Brazil ==
On his return to Brazil in 1989, he accepted a position as assistant professor at the Department of Pharmacology of the Medical School of the State University of Campinas. There, he was promoted to adjunct professor in 1996. Finally he became in 2001 a full professor by the Department of Pharmacology of the Biomedical Sciences Institute of the University of São Paulo.

Dr. De Nucci is a member of the Brazilian Academy of Medicine and one of the biomedical scientists in the world, according to the Institute for Scientific Information. He has more than 200 papers published in international peer-reviewed journals, and is among the 60 first placed in number of inventions and patents in Brazil, with 28 requests.

== Centres founded ==
Gilberto De Nucci founded the Cartesius Analytical Unit, a enterprise on the quality approval of new drugs as "generics" throughout bioequivalence essays. He also established the Galeno Research Centre, which conducts clinical trials as well as bioequivalence essays. Both centres accomplish pioneering work in Brazil, based on high technology and rigorous medical ethics and scientific methods.
