= Cássia dos Coqueiros =

Municipality in the state of São Paulo in Brazil

- Municipality
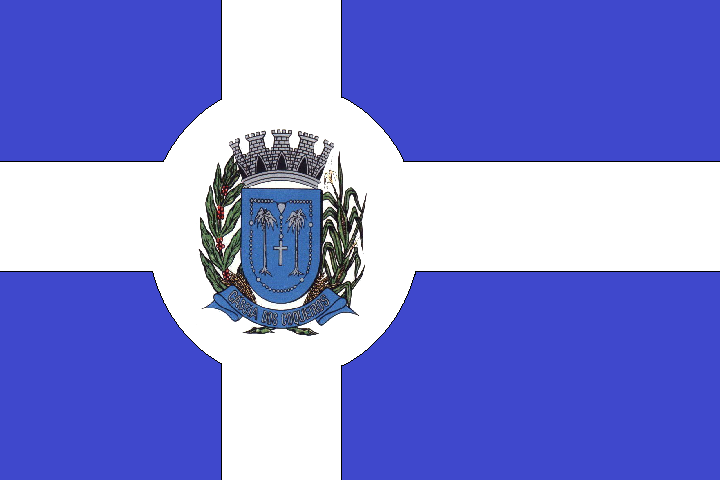
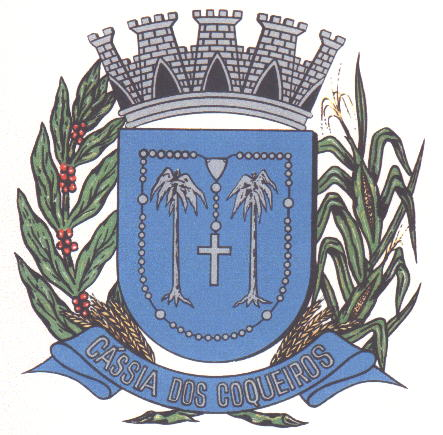
- Flag Coat of arms

- Location in São Paulo state

- Location in Brazil
- Coordinates: 21°16′58″S 47°10′11″W
- Country: Brazil
- Region: Southeast
- State: São Paulo

Area
  - Total: 192 km^{2} (74 sq mi)

Population (2020)
  - Total: 2,505
  - Density: 13.0/km^{2} (33.8/sq mi)
- Time zone: UTC−3 (BRT)

Cássia dos Coqueiros is a municipality in the state of São Paulo in Brazil. The population is 2,505 (2020 est.) in an area of 192 km^{2} (74 sq mi). The elevation is 890 m.

== See also ==
- List of municipalities in São Paulo
