= José Aristodemo Pinotti =

Brazilian politician (1934–2009)

Member of the Chamber of Deputies
- In office 1 February 2003 – 1 July 2009
- Constituency: São Paulo
- In office 1 February 1995 – 1 February 1999
- Constituency: São Paulo

Personal details
- Born: 20 December 1934 São Paulo, Brazil
- Died: 1 July 2009 (aged 74) São Paulo, Brazil
- Party: PMDB (1994–2003); DEM (2003–2009)
- Education: University of São Paulo (BMBS)
- Profession: Surgeon, gynecologist, physician

José Aristodemo Pinotti (20 December 1934 – 1 July 2009) was a Brazilian physician, gynecological surgeon, university professor, scientific and educational leader and politician.

At the time of his death he was a federal congressman by the state of State of São Paulo, in his second mandate. He had retired from his professorship at the State University of Campinas and as chairman of the Department of Gynecology and Obstetrics of the Medical School of the University of São Paulo. He had a private clinic in São Paulo, CLAP, as well as a private research and education institute.

Dr. Pinotti studied medicine at the Medical School of the University of São Paulo, where he also obtained his doctorate.

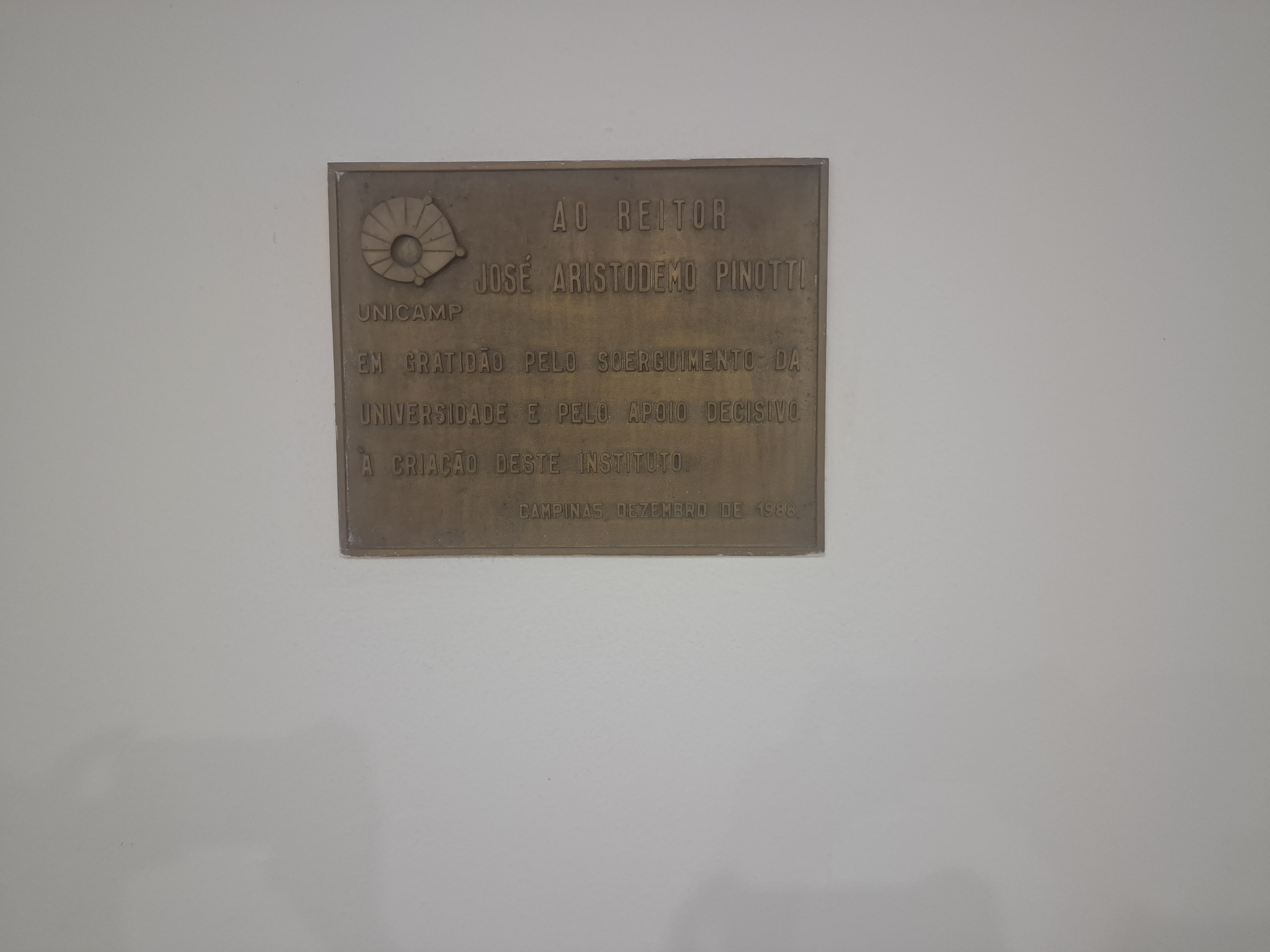
Plaque in honor of José Aristodemo Pinotti present at the University of Campinas Institute of Economics.

Besides his current positions, Dr. Pinotti has had many executive and leadership positions:

- Full professor and Chief of the Department of Tocogynecology of the Medical School of the State University of Campinas (UNICAMP), in Campinas
- Dean of the Medical School of UNICAMP
- Founder and director of the UNICAMP's Center for Integral Women's Health Care (CAISM - Centro de Atenção Integral à Saúde da Mulher)
- Rector of the State University of Campinas (1982-1986)
- Secretary of Education of the State of São Paulo (1986-1987)
- Secretary of Health of the State of São Paulo (1987-1991)
- Secretary of Education of the city of São Paulo (2005-2006)
- State Secretary of Higher Education of São Paulo (2007-2008)

He was also a candidate for mayor of the cities of Campinas and São Paulo and for vice-governor of the state of São Paulo.

As a researcher and scientist, Dr. Pinotti was extremely influential in his area. His specialty was Gynecology and Obstetrics, specifically oncology. He was considered one of the foremost international experts in surgery for breast cancer and at least one procedure bears his name (the Koppke-Pinotti technique). He authored, edited or co-edited 81 books and hundreds of scientific papers. Dr. Pinotti was a member of the Brazilian Academy of Medicine, and was president of the International Federation of Gynecology and Obstetrics. He was also an emeritus professor of the University of São Paulo and honoris causa doctor of the University of Bologna, Italy.
