= Instituto de Biología y Medicina Experimental =

Argentine research and development centre

Coordinates: 34.5579°S 58.4588°W

Institute of Biology and Experimental Medicine (IByME)
- Instituto de Biología y Medicina Experimental
- Formation: 1944
- Founder: Bernardo A. Houssay
- Purpose: Scientific research
- Location: Buenos Aires, Argentina
- Parent organization: University of Buenos Aires
- Website: http://www.ibyme.org.ar/

The Institute of Biology and Experimental Medicine (Spanish: Instituto de Biología y Medicina Experimental, IByME) is a research and development centre affiliated to the University of Buenos Aires, in Buenos Aires, Argentina.

== History ==
The institute was privately founded on March 14, 1944, by Dr. Bernardo A. Houssay, Nobel Prize in Physiology and Medicine (1947) for his work in diabetes and the control of the carbohydrate metabolism. Drs. Eduardo Braun-Menéndez, Oscar Orías, Juan T. Lewis and Virgilio G. Foglia were co-founders. The founding of the institute was motivated by the dismissal of Dr. Houssay, together with 150 other professors from the University of Buenos Aires, by the military government. Dr. Houssay became its director and brought to work with him several colleagues and students. The initiative was made possible by the support of Dr. Miguel F. Laphitzondo and others who granted financial contributions in memory of Juan B. Sauberán.

The institute was the first organization devoted to scientific research in Argentina. Its initial structure resembled that of the Rockefeller Institute for Medical Research (now Rockefeller University, New York, United States) and of the Pasteur Institute, Paris, France. In 1949, the institute was established as a chartered foundation recognized by the National Bureau of Non-Profit Entitites (Registro Nacional de Entidades de Bien Público).

Later on, several Houssay's disciples left the institute to settle research groups in many Argentine and other Latin American universities. Many research laboratories were founded following the model of Houssay's Institute. For example, Dr. Miguel Rolando Covian chaired the Department of Physiology of the Faculty of Medicine of Ribeirão Preto of the University of São Paulo from 1952 to 1986, giving origin to a large scientific group in Brazil.

On January 16, 1959, Eduardo Braun Menéndez, who played an outstanding role in the life of the institute, died. His vacancy in the board of directors was filled by Dr. Luis F. Leloir who would later receive the Nobel Prize in Chemistry (1970).

After Dr. Houssay and others were reintegrated into the University of Buenos Aires, in 1959, the institute was affiliated to this university, remaining so until today. Dr. Bernardo Houssay was the director of the Institute until his death in 1971. Thereupon, an Administrative Commission led by Prof. Dr. Virgilio Foglia, assisted by Dr. Julia V. Uranga and Dr. Luis F. Leloir, undertook the institute's affairs. The Institute established legal associations with the National Scientific and Technical Research Council.

The death of Prof. Dr. Luis F. Leloir, in December 1987, and the growth of the Institute prompted the need of increasing the number of members in the Administrative Commission. Accordingly, the necessary changes in the Institute Bylaws were submitted to the National Bureau of Legal Entitites (Dirección General de Personas Jurídicas) for approval. While the new Bylaws were under consideration, Drs. Alberto Baldi, Jorge Blaquier, Ricardo Calandra, Eduardo Charreau, Alejandro De Nicola, Enrique Segura, Alicia Roldán, Enrique del Castillo, Carlos Libertun, and Marta Tesone collaborated with Dr. Virgilio G. Foglia and Dr. Uranga in the administration of the institute.

On July 12, 1993, the institute was given the status of a Unit of Technological Transfer by the Argentinian Secretary of Science and Technology. This enabled the participation of technological and scientific sectors as consultants to productive sectors, public or private, both in the selection and adaptation of available technology and in the transfer of results derived from research.

== Activities ==
The interests of the Institute can be grouped into three categories:

- Basic and applied investigations in physiology, biochemistry and molecular biology;
- Training of students and pre- and postdoctoral fellows; and
- Organization of courses at pre- and post-graduate levels.

The institute is the site for the Argentine Committee of the Postdoctoral Program of selection of postdoctoral research fellowships in the area of Biomedical Sciences granted by John E. Fogarty International Center from the National Institutes of Health, Bethesda, Maryland; such Committee being chaired by Dr. Eduardo Charreau.

Historically, the main discoveries were in the fields of endocrinology and physiology. The current research areas are wider and include Neurosciences, Biology of Reproduction, Experimental Oncology and Immunology. Results are published in journals of international recognition, thus demonstrating the level of excellence reached by the different research groups.
