= Associação Brasileira de Editores Científicos =

Brazilian nonprofit organization

- Abbreviation: ABEC Brasil
- Founded: November 28, 1985; 40 years ago
- Type: Brazilian not-for-profit organization
- Purpose: Developing and improving the publication of scientific journals.
- Headquarters: Botucatu, São Paulo (state), Brazil
- President: Sigmar de Mello Rode
- Board of directors: Rui Seabra Ferreira Júnior (Former President); Lia Machado Fiuza Fialho (Vice-President); Piotr Trzesniak (Secretary-General); Germana Fernandes Barata (1st Secretary); Ilda Fontes (1st Treasurer); Edna Frasson de Souza Montero (2nd Treasurer)
- Website: www.abecbrasil.org.br

The Associação Brasileira de Editores Científicos (ABEC Brasil), is a Brazilian nonprofit organization founded in 1985, and dedicated to the advancement of publication of scientific journals. ABEC Brasil is headquartered in Botucatu, São Paulo (state), Brazil and its president is Sigmar de Mello Rode.

== History ==
ABEC Brasil was founded on October 11, 1985, during the Second Meeting of Scientific Journal Editors, at ICB/USP. Its first President was Francisco Alberto de Moura Duarte.

== Activities ==
ABEC Brasil is interested in developing and improving the publication of scientific journals, and stimulates this through regularly publishing material of scientific editorial interest, promoting of conferences, seminars and courses, and maintaining contact with institutions and related societies in Brazil and abroad.

== See also ==
- SciELO
- Latin American and Caribbean Health Sciences Literature
- National Council for Scientific and Technological Development
