= Bernardo Houssay =

Argentinian physician (1887–1971)

Bernardo Houssay TOSD
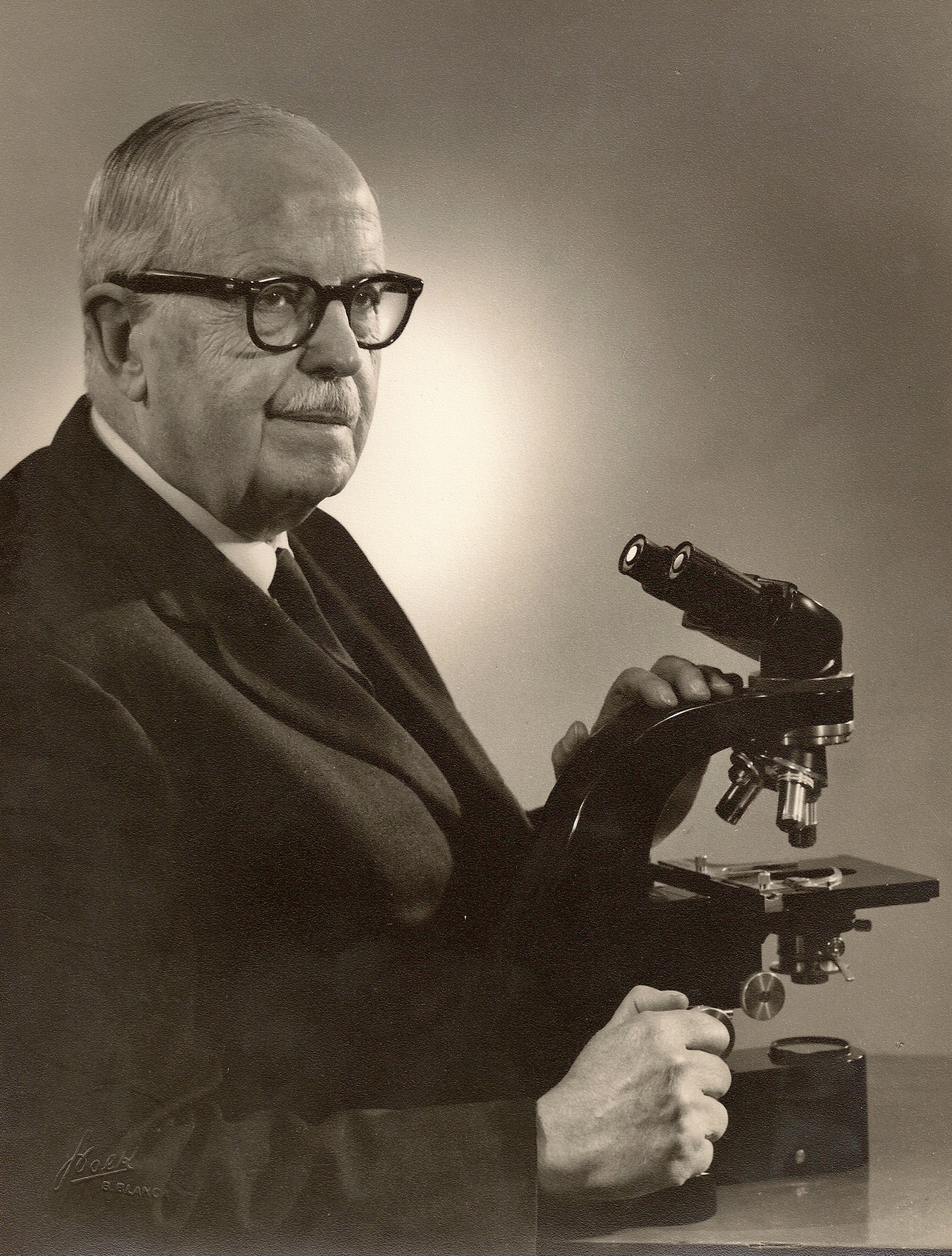
- Born: Bernardo Alberto Houssay; April 10, 1887; Buenos Aires, Argentina
- Died: September 21, 1971 (aged 84); Buenos Aires, Argentina
- Education: University of Buenos Aires
- Known for: Investigating the metabolism of carbohydrates, particularly in diabetes mellitus
- Spouse: María Angélica Catán
- Awards: Nobel Prize for Physiology or Medicine (1947); James Cook Medal (1948)
- Scientific career
- Fields: Physiology, endocrinology

Bernardo Alberto Houssay (April 10, 1887 – September 21, 1971) was an Argentinian physiologist. Houssay was a co-recipient of the 1947 Nobel Prize for Physiology or Medicine for discovering the role played by pituitary hormones in regulating the amount of glucose in animals, sharing the prize with Carl Ferdinand Cori and Gerty Cori. He is the first Latin American Nobel laureate in the sciences.

== Biography ==
=== Early life ===
Bernardo Alberto Houssay was born April 10, 1887, in Buenos Aires. His parents Albert and Clara Houssay were immigrants from France. A precocious youngster, he was admitted to the Pharmacy School at the University of Buenos Aires at 14 years of age and subsequently to the Faculty of Medicine of the same university at 17 years old and was there from 1904 to 1910. While a third-year medical student, Houssay took up a post as a research and teaching assistant in the Chair of Physiology.

=== Career ===
After graduating, he quickly developed and presented his M.D. thesis on the physiological activities of pituitary extracts, published in 1911. This was a theme he would pursue for the rest of his scientific career. Since 1908 he was an assistant lecturer in the same department and immediately after his doctorate, he took up the post of Professor of Physiology in the university's School of Veterinary Medicine. Simultaneously, he started a private practice as an assistant physician at the municipal hospital of Buenos Aires. In 1913, he became Chief Physician at the Alvear Hospital, and in 1915, became Chief of the Section of Experimental Pathology at the National Public Health Laboratories in Buenos Aires.

In 1919, Houssay was appointed as the chair of physiology at the University of Buenos Aires Medicine School, serving there until 1943. He transformed and directed the department into a highly respected research department in experimental physiology and medicine of international class. In that year, however, the military dictatorship deprived him of his university posts, due to his liberal political ideas and Houssay was forced to re-establish his research lines and staff at a privately funded Instituto de Biología y Medicina Experimental. This situation, reinforced by a second dismissal by the Peronist government in 1945, was prolonged until 1955 when Peron was ousted from power and Houssay was reinstated in the University of Buenos Aires, where he remained until he died. From 1957, he was also director of the National Scientific and Technical Research Council.

Houssay worked in many fields of physiology, but his main contribution was experimental investigation of the role of the anterior hypophysis gland in the metabolism of carbohydrates, particularly in diabetes mellitus. Houssay demonstrated in the 1930s the diabetogenic effect of anterior hypophysis extracts and the decrease in diabetes severity with anterior hypophysectomy. These discoveries stimulated the study of hormonal feedback control mechanisms which are central to all aspects of modern endocrinology. This work was recognized by the Nobel Prize in Physiology or Medicine in 1947.

Houssay's many disciples along his years of activity became also influential themselves as they spread around the world; such as Eduardo Braun-Menéndez, and Miguel Rolando Covian, who went to become the "father" of Brazilian neurophysiology, as chairman of the Department of Physiology of the Medical Faculty of Ribeirão Preto of the University of São Paulo. Houssay wrote with them the most influential textbook of Human Physiology in Latin America, in Spanish and Portuguese, which, since 1950 has been published in successive editions and used in almost all medical schools of the continent. Houssay published more than 600 scientific papers and several specialized books. Besides the Nobel, Houssay won many distinctions and awards from the Universities of Harvard, Cambridge, Oxford, Paris, and 15 other universities, as well as the Dale Medal of the Society for Endocrinology in 1960.

Houssay was also very active as a scientific leader and promoter of the advancement of scientific research and medical education, in Argentina as well as in Latin America. Houssay was elected a Member of the United States National Academy of Sciences in 1940, an International Honorary Member of the American Academy of Arts and Sciences in 1941, a Foreign Member of the Royal Society (ForMemRS) in 1943, and an International Member of the American Philosophical Society in 1944.

=== Legacy ===
- In 1996, the Prefectura Naval Argentina acquired a ketch-rigged research vessel from CONICET, renaming her Dr. Bernardo Houssay (MOV 1).
- Houssay's pioneering research on the endocrine hormones system, or "hormone feedback loops", was the basis for the cortisol injection treatment for US President John F. Kennedy's often-fatal adrenal insufficiency, diagnosed in 1947.
- The specific name of Yeneen houssayi honors Houssay.

== Tributes ==
On 8 April 2013, Google celebrated Bernardo Alberto Houssay's 126th Birthday with a doodle.
