= Faculdade de Medicina de Ribeirão Preto =

Medical school in São Paulo, Brazil

Coordinates: 21°11′07″S 47°48′33″W

Ribeirão Preto Medical School
- Faculdade de Medicina de Ribeirão Preto
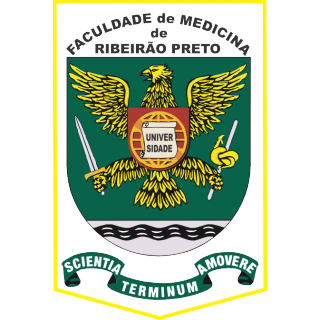
- Motto: Scientia terminum amovere
- Type: Public
- Established: 1948 (de jure); 1951 (de facto)
- Affiliation: University of São Paulo
- Location: Ribeirão Preto, São Paulo, Brazil
- Campus: Urban
- Website: www.fmrp.usp.br

Faculdade de Medicina de Ribeirão Preto (FMRP-USP) (English: Ribeirão Preto Medical School) is a medical school of the University of São Paulo located in the city of Ribeirão Preto, state of São Paulo, Brazil. It was founded in 1952.

FMRP-USP is the second medical school of the University of São Paulo, alongside Faculty of Medicine of the University of São Paulo (FMUSP), located in the city of São Paulo, and Bauru Faculty of Medicine of the University of São Paulo (FMBRU-USP), located in Bauru.

Its main campus is located in a charming old coffee farm in the outskirts of the city, with a total built area of 38,205 m^{2} (411,240 sq ft), including a small lake. It has a central building with the main departments for the basic medical sciences and an adjoining University Hospital, with 847 beds. In 2003, the hospital provided in-patient care to 33,973 persons and out-patient (ambulatory) care to approximately 588,000. All medical care is provided free of charge.

It is considered one of the three best medical schools in the country and a premier medical research center.

== History ==
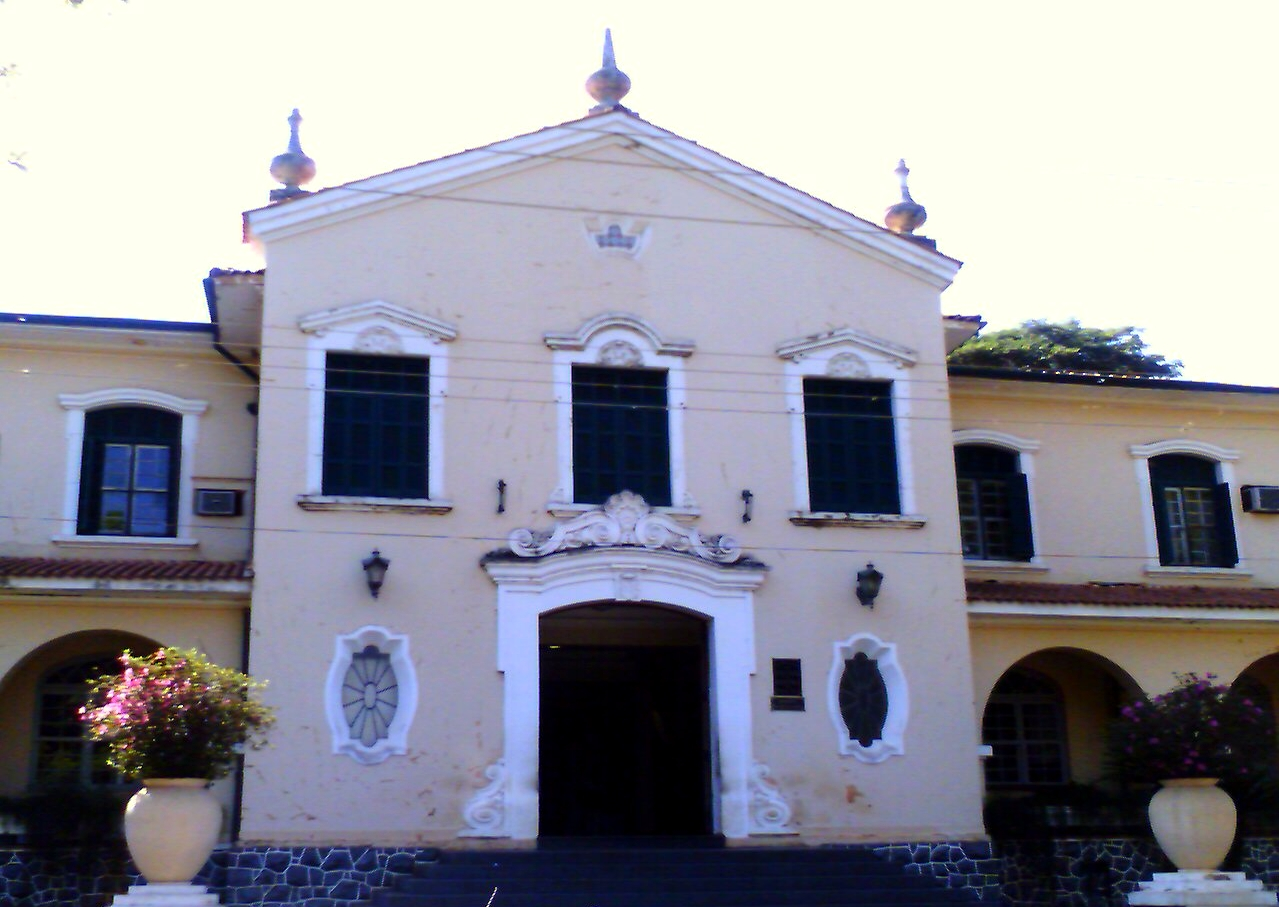
Main building of the Medical School

The Ribeirão Preto Medical School was the third founded in the state of São Paulo and the first outside the capital. In 1951, the state government supported the creation of the school as a way of promoting a better coverage of physicians to the rapidly growing cities in its hinterland. A committee was formed in the University of São Paulo to study and to propose the new school. A professor from the University, physician and parasitologist Dr. Zeferino Vaz was nominated as its chairman and later became the Faculty's first dean, remaining until 1964. With great foresight, and against many resistances of the traditional medical academic establishment, he advocated a modern, research-based school, with all professors with full-time dedication. This was unheard of at that time in Brazil: in this Vaz was trying to follow the most successful American medical schools, such as Johns Hopkins Medical School. Lacking the researchers and professors with the mentality and experience he needed, he resorted to inviting them from Europe and United States.

The school campus was established in a beautiful wooded area in the outskirts of Ribeirão Preto, which was formerly the seat of a state technical agricultural school, and before that, a coffee farm. In the beginning, since the city still lacked adequate resources for housing the professors, several houses in a Mediterranean style were built and furnished for free, thus compensating for the relatively small salaries that were paid to them at that time.

By means of such drive to excellence, soon the School of Medicine of Ribeirão Preto achieved prominence and a unique status in Brazil.

In 2013, it, along with the São Paulo Research Foundation, made plans to begin testing an HIV vaccine, HIVBr18, in monkeys.

== Departments ==
- Cellular and Molecular Biology and Pathogenic Bioagents
- Biomechanics Medicine and Rehabilitation of the Locomotor Apparatus
- Biochemistry and Immunology
- Surgery and Anatomy
- Internal medicine
- Pharmacology
- Physiology
- Genetics
- Gynecology and Obstetrics
- Social medicine
- Neurosciences and Behavioral Sciences
- Psychiatry and Medical psychology
- Ophthalmology
- Otorhinolaryngology and Head and Neck Surgery
- Pathology and Pediatrics

== Centers and associations ==
- CEMEL - Death Verification Service (Medico-legal service, Morgue)
- CSE - School Health Center which includes 5 Family Care Units; Pedreira de Freitas Community Center, in Cássia dos Coqueiros, Vila Lobato Community Center, in Ribeirão Preto;
- Hemocenter (Hematology)
- CAEP - Educational and Psychological Support Center
- Centro Acadêmico Rocha Lima (Student Union)
- Alumni Association

== Figures ==
The School has 273 faculty (48 at full professor, 78 at adjunct professor and 144 at assistant professor levels), and a clerical and technical staff of 448. All faculty has full-time dedication and is research oriented. 531 papers were published in peer-reviewed international journals in 2003, and 932 in peer-reviewed national journals.

Undergraduate education has 6 years of medical education, with a 2003 enrollment of 806. Degrees were granted till 2003, being 3699 in Medicine, and 236 in Biological Sciences, Medical Modality.

Postgraduate education covers 17 areas, granting master and doctoral degrees. The enrollment in 2003 was of 1221 students, of which 677 at the master's level and 544 at doctoral level. It is one of the largest such programs in Latin America. Until 2003, 2060 master degrees and 1360 doctoral degrees were conferred, with a grand total of 3420. It is also one of the best, with 9 areas with a rating between 5 (good) and 7 (excellent) by the Ministry of Education.

The medical residency program had 28 programs and 504 physicians.

== Notable professors ==
The Ribeirão Preto Medical School has had a number of important Brazilian scientists and physicians, who contributed a great share to the development of science and technology in Brazil:

- Miguel Rolando Covian, professor of Physiology
- Eduardo Krieger, professor of cardiovascular physiology, former president of the Brazilian Academy of Sciences
- Maurício Rocha e Silva, professor of Pharmacology, discoverer of bradykinin
- Sérgio Henrique Ferreira, professor of Pharmacology, discoverer of the Bradykinin Potentiating Factor
- Warwick Estevam Kerr, professor of Genetics
- Lucien Lison, professor of Morphology and one of the founders of histochemistry
- Fritz Köberle, professor of Pathology, proponent of the neurogenic theory of the chronic phase of Chagas disease
- Hélio Lourenço de Oliveira, professor of Internal medicine, who was also a Dean of the University of São Paulo
- Renato Migliorini, professor of physiology
- José Lima Pedreira de Freitas, professor of preventive medicine, epidemiologist and sanitarist, famous for his studies of Chagas disease
- José Moura Gonçalves, professor of Biochemistry, discoverer of the protein structure of Bothrops venom
- Maria Carmelo Lico, professor of Physiology

== Notable alumni ==
- Antonio Palocci, politician, former mayor of Ribeirão Preto, former Minister of Economy
- Sócrates, former star footballer and Brazilian national captain
- Marco Antonio Zago, hematologist, current president of the Brazilian Research Council
- Gilberto de Nucci, pharmacologist
- Renato M.E. Sabbatini, neuroscientist, writer and publisher

== Gallery ==
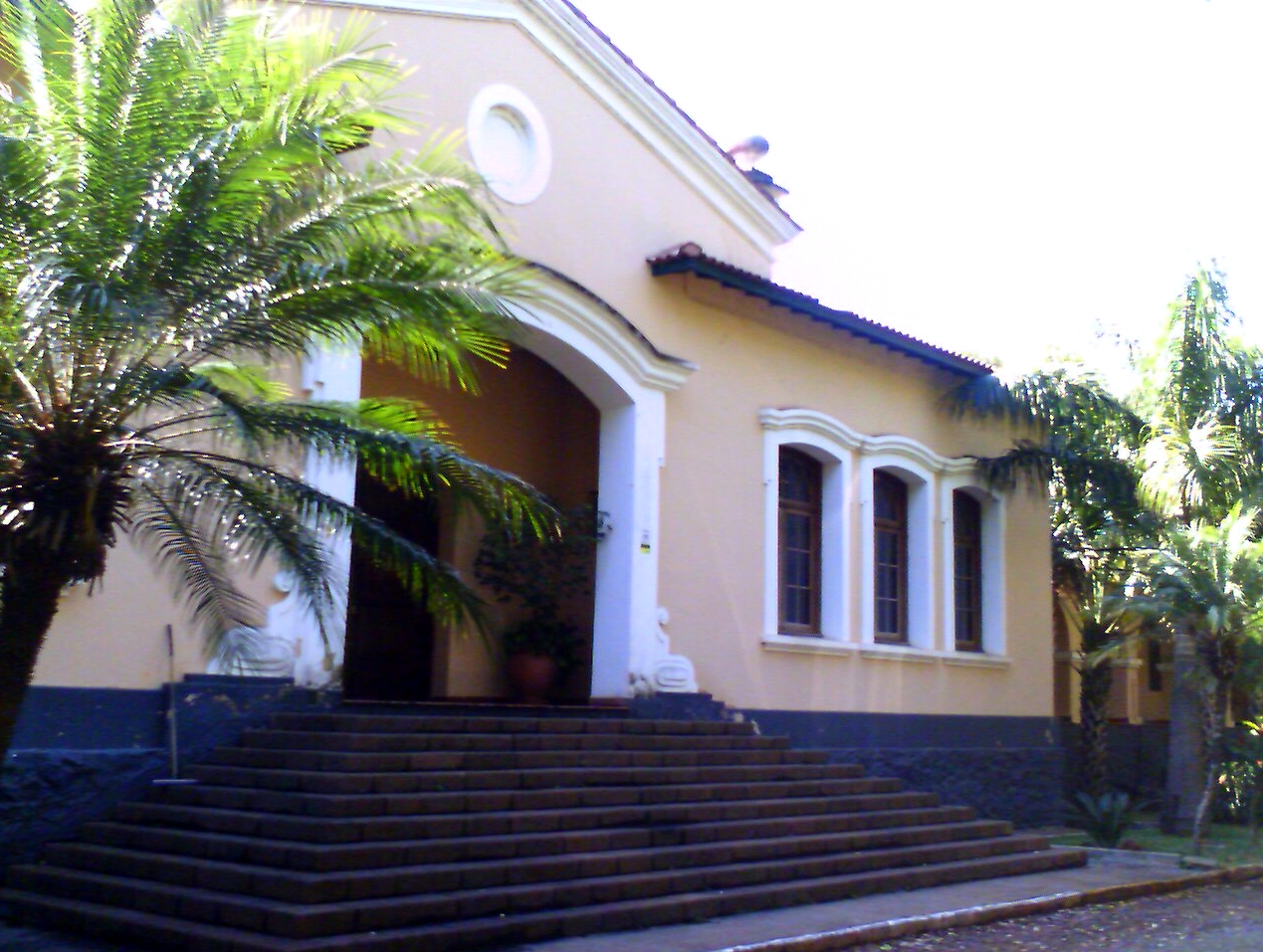
Department of Pathology

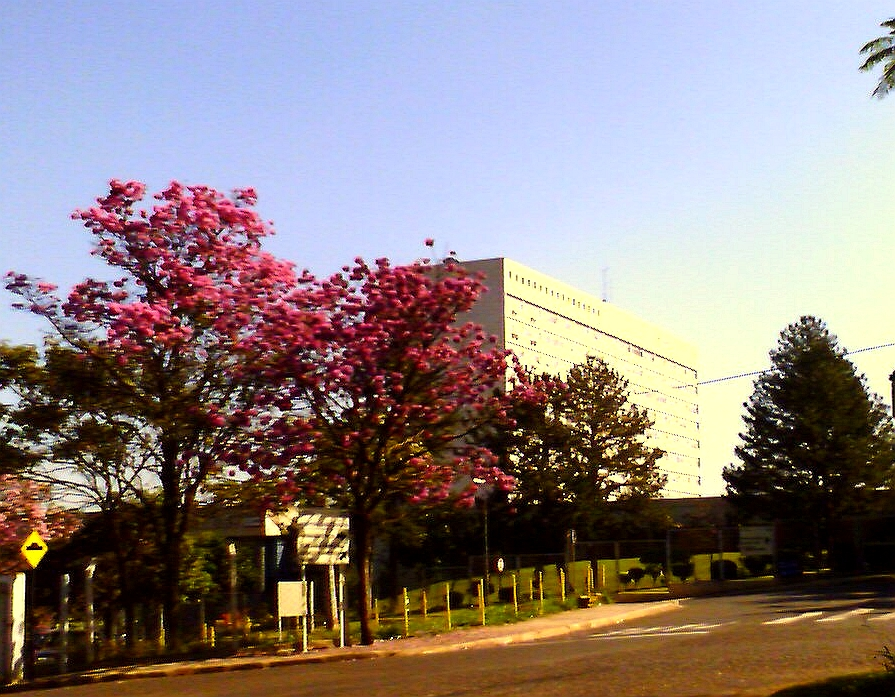
University Hospital

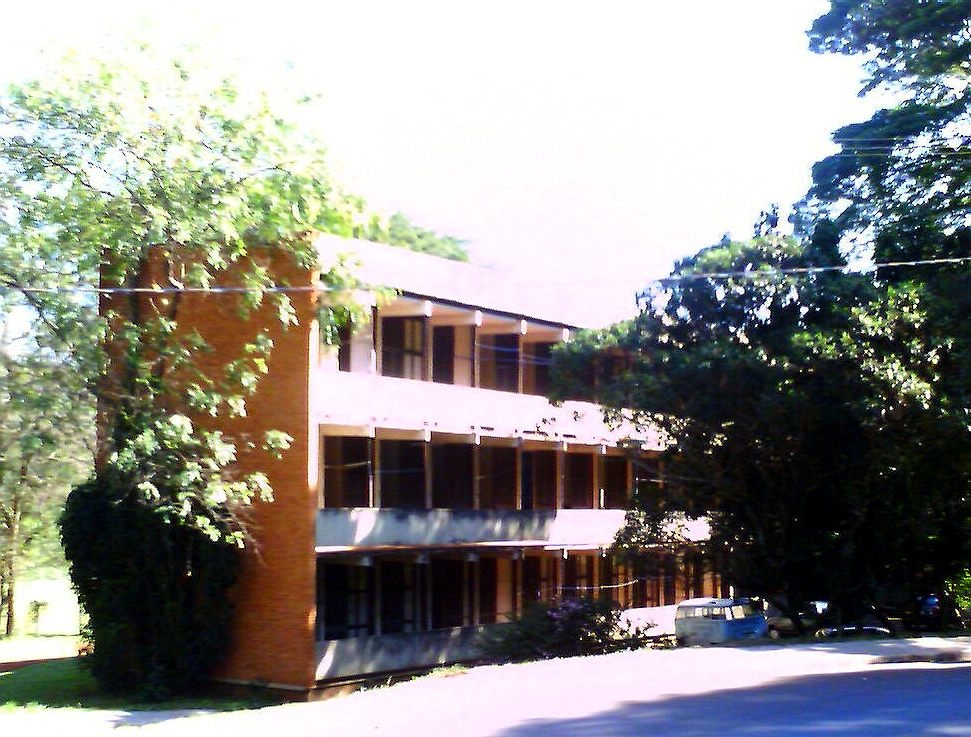
Medical Student Housing

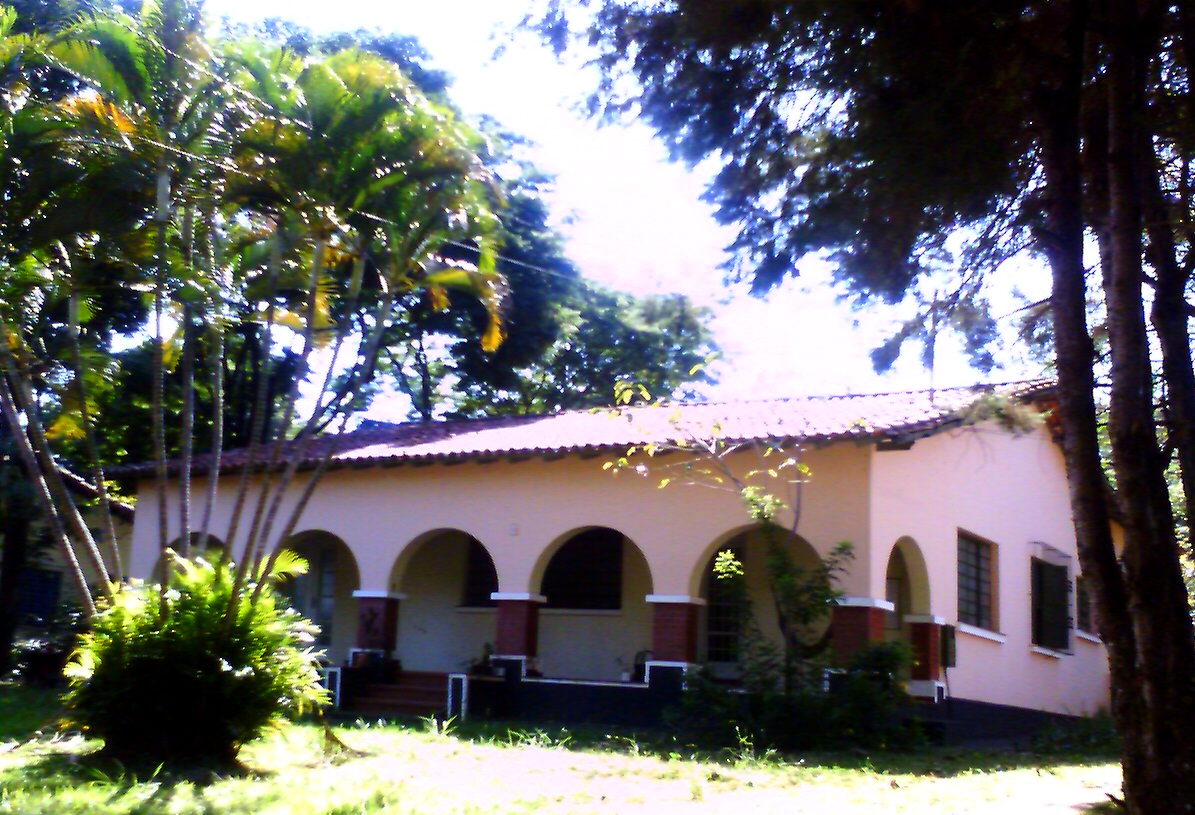
A professor's house

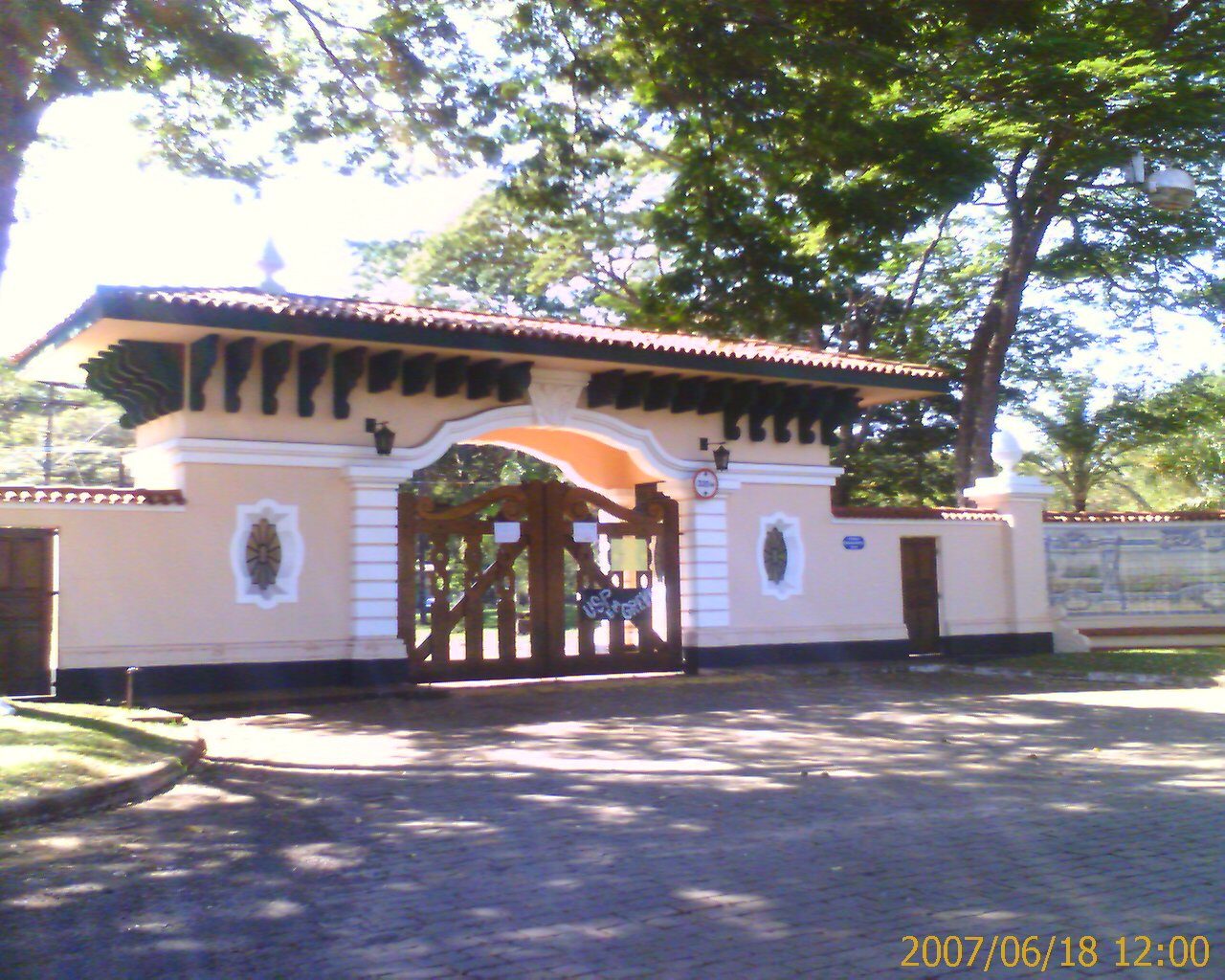
Main gates

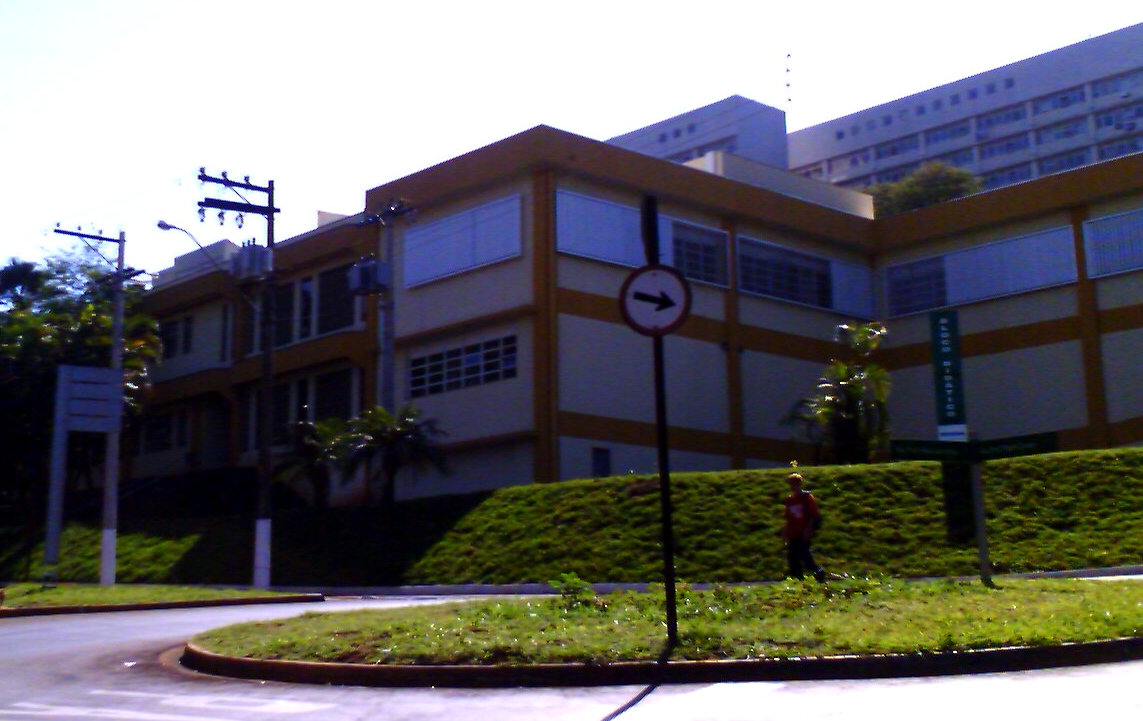
Administration building

== See also ==
- List of medical schools
