= Zeferino Vaz =

Brazilian physician and academic (1908-1981)

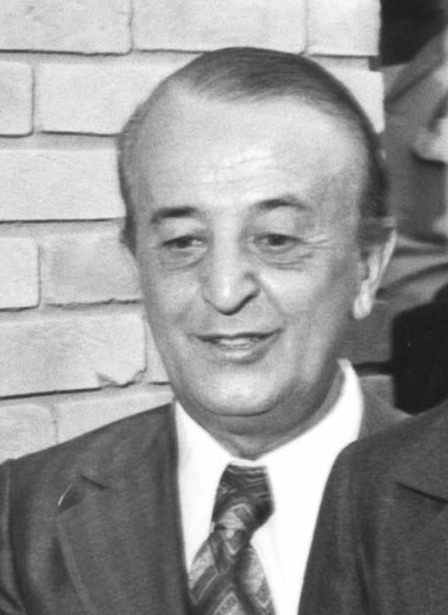
c. 1974

Zeferino Vaz (May 27, 1908 – February 19, 1981) was a Brazilian physician and academic who coordinated the construction and development of the State University of Campinas, whose main campus is named in his honor. He strived to bring together leading scientists to teach at the University.

Zeferino was born and lived his childhood in São Paulo. He attended the Medicine school of the University of São Paulo and got his M.D. degree in 1932, with specializations in Parasitology, Parasitic Diseases, Biology, Genetics and Zoology.

Shortly after his graduation, Zeferino became professor of Zoology and Parasitology in the Veterinary Medicine School of the University of São Paulo. He was the director of the Veterinary Medicine School from 1936 to 1947. From 1951 to 1964 he was the director-founder of the Medical School of Ribeirão Preto, and during this period, in 1963, he was state secretary of public health. From 1964 to 1965 he was the first president of the São Paulo State Council of Education and rector of the University of Brasília.

In 1965 Zeferino was designated president of the organizing commission for the Universidade Estadual de Campinas. Zeferino became rector in 1966 and stayed in the office until 1978. Zeferino led the construction of the university campus, now named after him, which had its first building inaugurated in 1968. Zeferino was responsible for bringing scientists from other universities, and this helped Unicamp become one of the most productive and respected research institutions of Latin America. By the end of Zeferino's administration, the university had evolved from the Medicine College to a university with 7 institutes, 6 colleges, 2 technical schools and 10 service units.

Zeferino retired in 1978, but remained president of the Unicamp development foundation (Funcamp) until 1981, when he died of coronary problems.

== See also ==
- Universidade Estadual de Campinas
- Universidade de São Paulo
