= Brazil and weapons of mass destruction =

Federative Republic of Brazil
- Nuclear program start date: 1970s (ended in 1990)
- First nuclear weapon test: None
- First thermonuclear weapon test: None
- Last nuclear test: None
- Largest yield test: None
- Total tests: None
- Peak stockpile: None
- Current stockpile: None
- Current strategic arsenal: None
- Cumulative strategic arsenal in megatonnage: None
- Maximum missile range: None
- NPT party: Yes

In the 1970s and 1980s, during the military dictatorship, Brazil had a secret program intended to develop nuclear weapons. The program was dismantled in 1990, five years after the military regime ended. Brazil is considered to possess no weapons of mass destruction but does have some of the key technologies needed to produce nuclear weapons.

Brazil is one of many countries (and one of the last) to forswear nuclear weapons under the terms of the Non-Proliferation Treaty. It is also a nuclear latent State — a country with the technical capability to develop nuclear weapons, without having pursued that possibility. (Note: "Brazil possesses one of the most advanced nuclear capabilities in Latin America and is among the few countries with an independent capacity to produce the fissile material necessary to build a nuclear weapon.")

== Nuclear program ==
In the 1950s, President Getúlio Vargas encouraged the development of independent national nuclear capabilities. At that time, the United States worked actively to prevent Brazil from acquiring the centrifuge technology that could be used to produce high-enriched uranium for nuclear weapons.

During the 1970s and 1980s, Brazil and Argentina embarked on a nuclear competition. Through technology transfers from the West German company Kraftwerk Union (a subsidiary of Siemens), which did not require IAEA safeguards, Brazil pursued a covert nuclear weapons program known as the "Parallel Program," with enrichment facilities (including small scale centrifuge enrichment plants, a limited reprocessing capability, and a missile program). Brazil also reportedly bought highly enriched uranium from China in the 1980s. In December 1982, then-president of the National Nuclear Energy Commission (CNEN), Rex Nazaré, headed a mission to China with the objective of purchasing enriched uranium from his Chinese counterparts at the China National Nuclear Corporation. Sources have indicated that, a few years later, Brazilian cylinders of hexafluoride were transported to China containing natural uranium. They returned to Brazil in a container that, supposedly, carried porcelain purchased by the First Lady Dulce Figueiredo during the presidential trip. In 1987, President José Sarney announced that Brazil had enriched uranium to 20%.

In 1990, President Fernando Collor de Mello symbolically closed the Cachimbo test site, in Pará, and exposed the military’s secret plan to develop a nuclear weapon. Brazil's National Congress opened an investigation into the Parallel Program. Congress members visited numerous facilities, including the Institute of Advanced Studies (IEAv) in São José dos Campos. They also interviewed key players in the nuclear program, such as former President João Figueiredo and retired Army General Danilo Venturini, the former head of the National Security Council under Figueiredo. The congressional investigation exposed secret bank accounts, code-named "Delta", which were managed by the CNEN and used for funding the program. The congressional report revealed that the IEAv had designed two atomic bomb devices, one with a yield of twenty to thirty kilotons and a second with a yield of twelve kilotons. The same report revealed that Brazil's military regime secretly exported eight tons of uranium to Iraq in 1981.

In 1991, Brazil and Argentina renounced their nuclear rivalry. On 13 December 1991, they signed the Quadripartite agreement, at the IAEA headquarters, creating the Brazilian–Argentine Agency for Accounting and Control of Nuclear Materials and allowing fullscope IAEA safeguards of Argentine and Brazilian nuclear installations.

Brazil officially opened the Resende enrichment plant in May 2006. Brazil's enrichment technology development, and the plant itself, involved substantial discussions with the IAEA and its constituent nations. The dispute came down to whether IAEA inspectors would be allowed to inspect the machines themselves. The Brazilian government did not allow the inspection of the centrifugal cascade halls, arguing that this would reveal technological secrets (probably relating to the use of a magnetic lower bearing in place of the more common mechanical bearing). The Brazilian authorities stated that, as Brazil is not part of any "axis of evil", the pressure for full access to inspection - even in universities - could be construed as an attempt to pirate industrial secrets. They also claimed that their technology is better than that of the United States and France, mainly because the centrifugal axis is not mechanical, but electromagnetic. Eventually, after extensive negotiations, agreement was reached that while not directly inspecting the centrifuges, the IAEA would inspect the composition of the gas entering and leaving the centrifuge. Then–U.S. Secretary of State Colin Powell stated in 2004 that he was sure that Brazil had no plans to develop nuclear weapons.

== Technological capability ==
It is likely that Brazil has retained the technological capacity and know-how to produce and deliver a nuclear weapon. Experts at the Los Alamos National Laboratory have concluded that in view of its previous nuclear activities, Brazil is in a position to produce nuclear weapons within three years. If Brazil decided to pursue a nuclear weapon, the centrifuges at the Resende enrichment plant could be reconfigured to produce highly enriched uranium for nuclear weapons. Even a small enrichment plant like Resende could produce several nuclear weapons per year, but only if Brazil was willing to do so openly.

The Brazilian Navy is currently developing a nuclear submarine fleet, and in 2007 authorised the construction of a prototype submarine propulsion reactor. In 2008, France agreed to transfer technology to Brazil for the joint development of the nuclear submarine hull.

== Facilities ==
=== Aramar Experimental Center ===
The Aramar Experimental Center (Portuguese: Centro Experimental de Aramar) located in Iperó in the State of São Paulo, was inaugurated in 1988 as the first uranium-only enrichment plant in Brazil. The facility is run by the CNEN and the Brazilian Navy. In addition to the Centrifuge Enrichment Plant, the facility also hosts an Isotopic Enrichment Laboratory and several Small Nuclear Centers (Portuguese: Pequenas Centrais Nucleares, or PCNs). The enrichment laboratories are under the National Safeguards control and national inspections are carried out by the Safeguards Division of CNEN.

=== Cachimbo Test Site ===
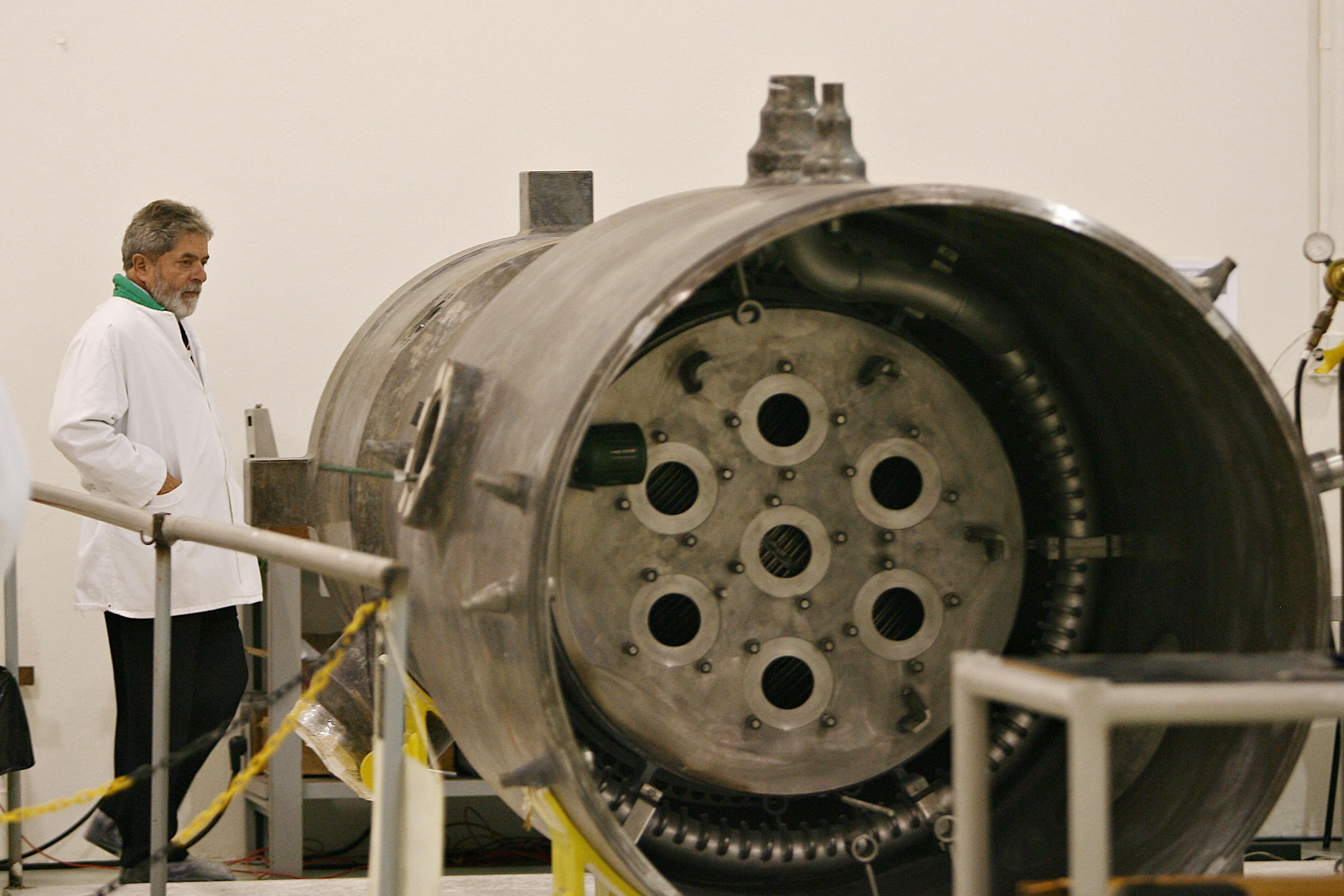
President Lula da Silva inspecting the Brazilian Navy's Nuclear Propulsion Development Facility in July 2007. This facility produces uranium hexafluoride gas for uranium enrichment.

The Cachimbo test site, officially named Brigadeiro Velloso Test Site (Portuguese: Campo de Provas Brigadeiro Velloso), is located in the State of Pará and covers 45,000 km^{2}, an area larger than the Netherlands. It is within this military area that a 320 meters-deep hole at the Cachimbo Mountain Range was a site for nuclear explosives tests. The shaft has been public knowledge since 1986 and was allegedly abandoned in September 1990, when President Fernando Collor de Mello used a small shovel to symbolically seal up the hole.

=== Brazilian Army Technology Center (Guaratiba) ===
The Brazilian Army Technology Center (Portuguese: Centro Tecnológico do Exército, or CTEx) located in Guaratiba - State of Rio de Janeiro, once worked on the project development of a plutonium-producing research reactor. Known as 'The Atlantic Project', it was conducted by the Special Projects Institute – IPE (closed on October 1, 2001). Nowadays, CTEx performs scientific research and technology development in defence activities in strict respect to the Constitution of the Federative Republic of Brazil and international laws. The CTEx's nuclear research laboratories are under the national regulatory authority (Brazilian Nuclear Energy Commission - CNEN) control and safeguards inspections verifications are performed jointly by the Brazilian-Argentine Agency for Accounting and Control of Nuclear Materials (ABACC) and the International Atomic Energy Agency (IAEA).

=== Aerospace Technology and Science Department (São José dos Campos) ===
The Department of Aerospace Science and Technology (Portuguese: Departamento de Ciência e Tecnologia Aerospacial, or DCTA) is a research facility located in São José dos Campos, in the State of São Paulo where nuclear research is also conducted.

=== Resende (Engenheiro Passos) Nuclear Fuel Factory ===
The Resende Nuclear Fuel Facility (Portuguese: Fábrica de Combustíveis Nucleares, or FCN) is a nuclear enrichment facility located in Resende, in the State of Rio de Janeiro. The plant is managed by the Nuclear Industries of Brazil (Portuguese: Indústrias Nucleares do Brasil, or INB) and by the Brazilian Navy.

== Legislation and conventions ==
Brazil's 1988 Constitution states in Article 21 that "all nuclear activity within the national territory shall only be admitted for peaceful purposes and subject to approval by the National Congress".

Brazil acceded to the Nuclear Non-Proliferation Treaty on September 18, 1998, ratified the Geneva Protocol on 28 August 1970, the Biological Weapons Convention on 27 February 1973, and the Chemical Weapons Convention on 13 March 1996.

Brazil signed the Treaty of Tlatelolco in 1967, making Brazil a nuclear-weapon-free zone.

Brazil is also an active participant in the International Atomic Energy Agency and the Nuclear Suppliers Group, multinational agencies concerned with reducing nuclear proliferation by controlling the export and re-transfer of materials that may be applicable to nuclear weapon development.

Brazil signed the Treaty on the Prohibition of Nuclear Weapons on September 20, 2017, but has not ratified it.

== See also ==
- Angra Nuclear Power Plant
- National Nuclear Energy Commission (CNEN)
- Brazilian-Argentine Agency for Accounting and Control of Nuclear Materials (ABACC)
- Brazilian Navy Nuclear Program
- Enéas Carneiro, 1998 presidential candidate who called for Brazil to have nuclear weapons.
