= Argentina–Brazil relations =

- Argentina: Brazil

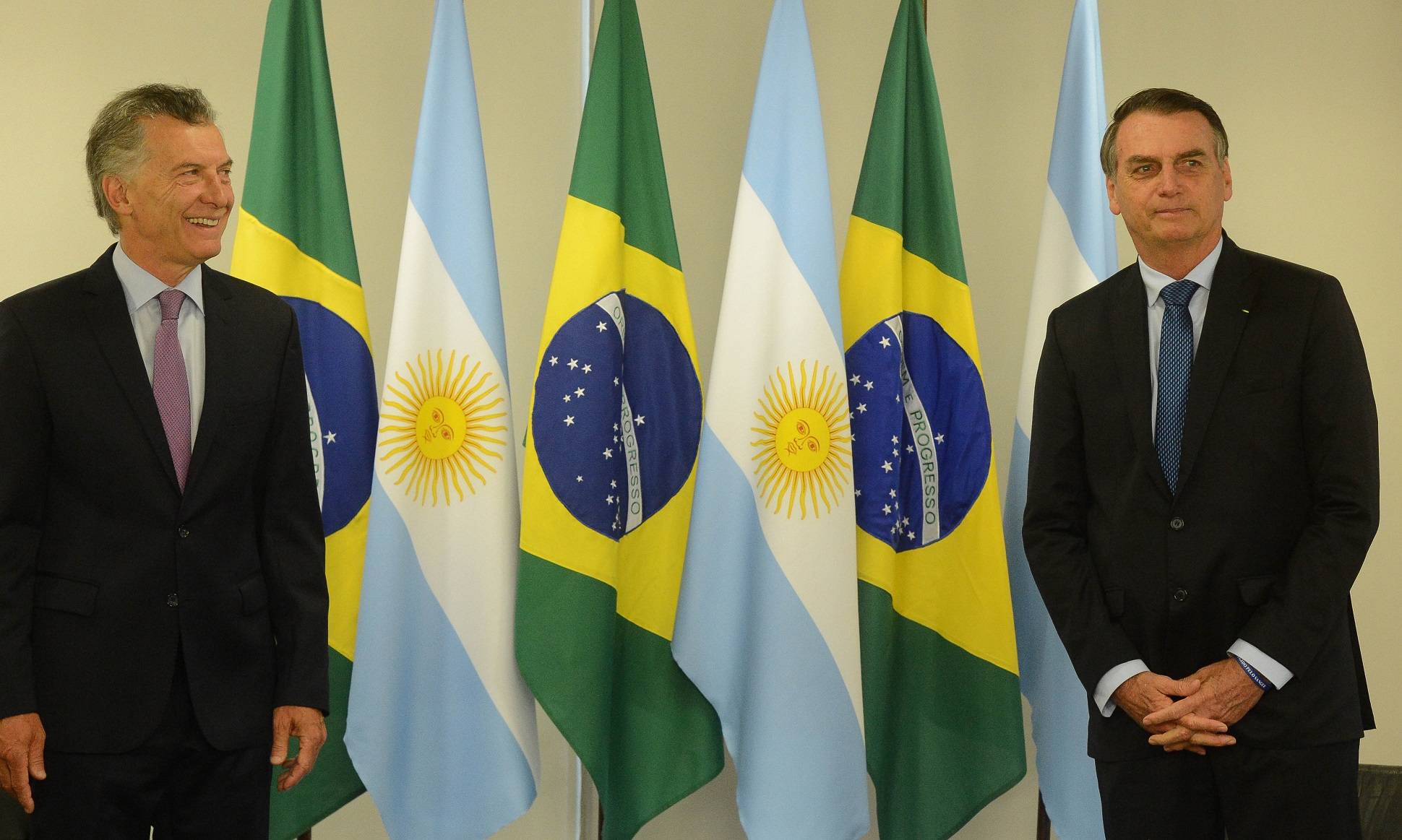
Then-Argentine President Mauricio Macri with then-Brazilian President Jair Bolsonaro in the Palácio do Planalto, January 2019. Both were defeated in their re-election for a second term in office.

The Argentina–Brazil relationship (Spanish: Relación Argentina-Brasil; Portuguese: Relação Argentina-Brasil) is both close and historical, and encompasses the economy, trade, culture, education, and tourism. From war and rivalry to friendship and alliance, this complex relationship has spanned more than two centuries. The countries also share a system of government, a federal republic with a presidential system.

Rio de Janeiro was the first capital to recognize Argentine independence, whereas Buenos Aires' was the first government to recognize Brazil's independence. After achieving independence from the Iberian crowns in the early nineteenth century, Argentina and Brazil inherited a series of unresolved territorial disputes from their colonial powers. The most serious breach in the relationship was the Cisplatine War (1825–1828), led by the Brazilian invasion and annexation of the Banda Oriental. Despite the numerous periods of muted hostility, the Argentine–Brazilian relationship was not defined by open hostility for most of the nineteenth and twentieth centuries. There was competition on many levels, and their respective defense policies reflected mutual suspicion, but the Brazilian economic rise in the 1980s led to the accommodation of Argentina as a secondary regional power and increasing cooperation.

With the creation of the Brazilian–Argentine Agency for Accounting and Control of Nuclear Materials in 1991, the two countries turned their nuclear competition into cooperation through mutual confidence. A high volume of trade and migration between Argentina and Brazil has generated closer ties, especially after the implementation of Mercosur in 1991.

== Overview ==
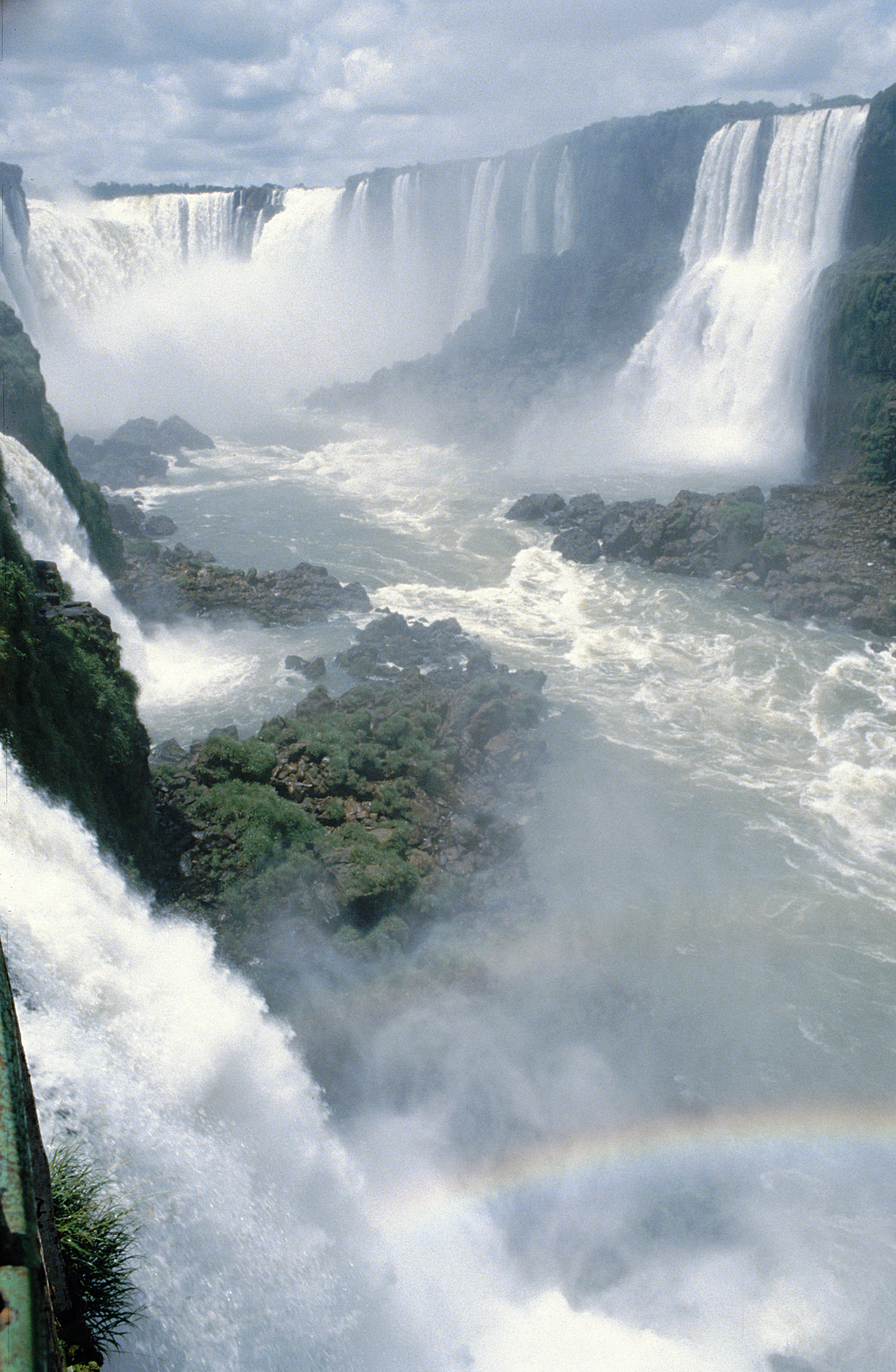
The Iguazu Falls are one of the New 7 Wonders of Nature and the largest waterfalls system in the world. The waterfalls are in the border between Argentina and Brazil.

	(Argentina) Argentine Republic	Federative Republic of Brazil
Coat of Arms		
Flag	Argentina	Brazil
Population	46,735,004	213,421,037
Area	2,780,085 km^{2} (1,073,397 mi^{2})	8,515,767 km^{2} (3,287,956 mi^{2})
Population Density	16.8/km^{2} (44/sq mi)	23.8/km^{2} (62/sq mi)
Capital	Buenos Aires	Brasília
Largest City	Buenos Aires – 3,121,707 (16,366,641 Metro)	São Paulo – 11,895,578 (21,518,955 Metro)
Government	Federal presidential constitutional republic	Federal presidential constitutional republic
First Leader	Bernardino Rivadavia	Pedro I
Current Leaders	Javier Milei	Luiz Inácio Lula da Silva
Official languages	Spanish (de facto)	Portuguese
GDP (nominal)	US$683.533 billion ($14,362 per capita)	US$2.126 trillion ($9,964 per capita)

== History ==
=== Independence and consolidation ===
Argentina and Brazil share the Río de la Plata basin– an area where Portuguese and Spanish conquistadors collided in their ambition to conquer new land for their respective crowns. After achieving independence from the Iberian crowns in the early nineteenth century, the Argentine Republic and the Brazilian Empire inherited a series of unresolved territorial disputes from their colonial powers, involving Paraguay and Uruguay, the other two nations of the Río de la Plata basin.

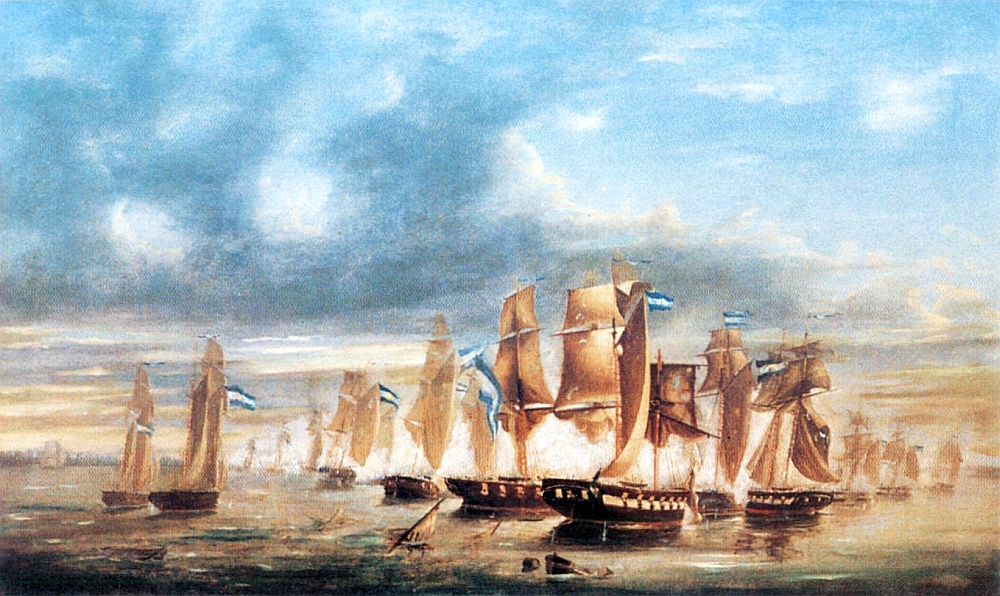
The battle of Juncal, during the Cisplatine War.

It was during this time that the Cisplatine War, the first armed conflict between both countries, started. From 1825 to 1828 the forces of the United Provinces of the Río de la Plata outfought those of the Brazilian Empire, until the signing of the Treaty of Montevideo that gave independence to Uruguay from both countries. Given the high cost of the war for both sides and the burdens it imposed on trade between the United Provinces and the United Kingdom, the latter pressed the two belligerent parties to engage in peace negotiations in Rio de Janeiro. Under British and French mediation, the United Provinces of River Plate and the Empire of Brazil signed the 1828 Treaty of Montevideo, which acknowledged the independence of the Cisplatine Province under the name Eastern Republic of Uruguay. Troops of both countries would face each other once again later, during the Platine War, when a coalition of Brazil, Uruguay and Argentine rebels managed to defeat Rosas (helped in turn by Uruguayan rebels led by Manuel Oribe). Another war almost happened during the 1870s when Brazil refused to accept Argentina's desire to take all the Chaco region for itself after the end of the Paraguayan War (also known as the War of the Triple Alliance) when both countries were allies against Paraguay.

Brazil did not settle disputes with Argentina over its precise national boundaries until the early twentieth century. It had settled with Uruguay in 1851, with Peru in 1851 and 1874, with Colombia in 1853, with Venezuela in 1859, with Bolivia in 1867 and with Paraguay in 1872, but not with Argentina, Guyana, French Guiana and Suriname. However, it had consolidated most of its vast territory under a single authority by the middle of the nineteenth century, achieved as the result of the work of the empire's political elite. In contrast, the Argentine Republic's nineteenth century experience was marked by infighting between contending factions—those favoring a federalist republic—struggling against the strong centralist tendencies of the city of Buenos Aires (Unitarians). Argentina's unification and territorial consolidation under a single authority was completed by the 1880s.

=== Consolidated states ===
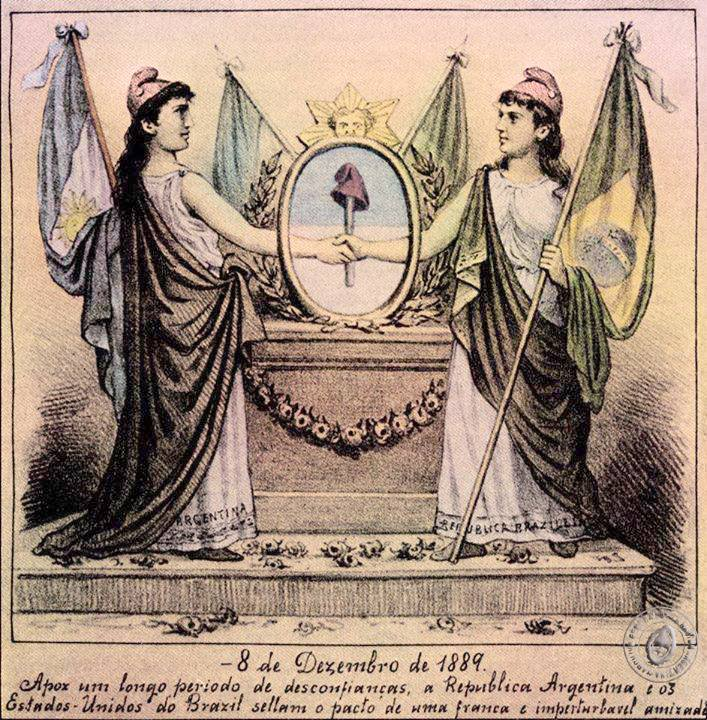
This 1890 allegoric drawing depicts the friendship between the Argentine Republic and the newly formed Brazilian Republic.

Despite this inheritance of unresolved territorial disputes and numerous periods of muted hostility, the Argentine–Brazilian relationship was not defined by open hostility for most of the nineteenth and twentieth centuries. There was competition on many levels, and their respective defense policies reflected mutual suspicion, but their bilateral relationship was not adversarial. After the mid-1850s, neither country resorted to coercion or the use of force to resolve territorial disputes, and during the only general war that took place in the Plata region– the Paraguayan War (1864–1870)– Argentina and Brazil were allied against Paraguay.

Nonetheless, at later part of 19th century, concerns from Argentina over Brazil's possible imperialistic ambition remained, as well as Brazil's close commercial tie with Chile, the rival of Argentina. Fear from possible Brazilian intervention in support for Chile amidst the War of the Pacific had led to Argentina maintaining status quo with Brazil.

=== Twentieth Century ===
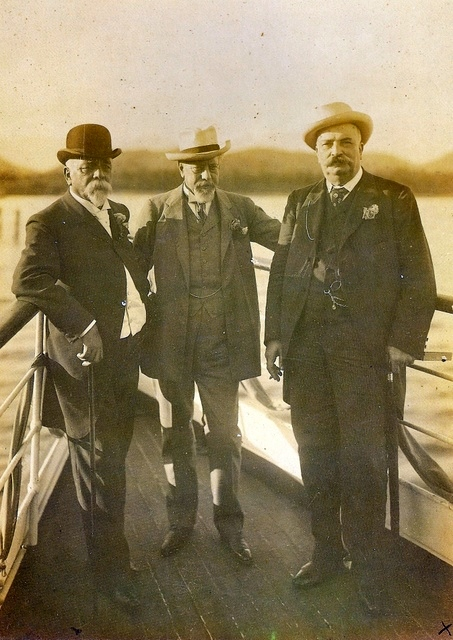
Visit of the President of Argentina, General Julio Argentino Roca, Brazil, March 1907.

In Brazil, the liberal revolution of 1930 overthrew the oligarchic coffee plantation owners and brought to power an urban middle class and business interests that promoted industrialization and modernization. Aggressive promotion of new industry turned around the economy by 1933. Brazil's leaders in the 1920s and 1930s decided that Argentina's implicit foreign policy goal was to isolate Portuguese-speaking Brazil from Spanish-speaking neighbors, thus facilitating the expansion of Argentine economic and political influence in South America. Even worse, was the fear that a more powerful Argentine Army would launch a surprise attack on the weaker Brazilian Army. To counter this threat, President Getúlio Vargas forged closer links with the United States. Meanwhile, Argentina moved in the opposite direction. During World War II, Brazil was a staunch ally of the United States and sent its military to Europe. The United States provided over $100 million in Lend-Lease grants, in return for free rent on air bases used to transport American soldiers and supplies across the Atlantic, and naval bases for anti-submarine operations. In sharp contrast, Argentina was officially neutral and at times favored Germany.

Communication and physical integration between the two neighbors was limited. The benefits of developing closer economic, political, and cultural relations were not considered until late in the 20th century.

Since 1945, the most acrimonious bilateral dispute concerned the control of water resources along the Alto Paraná basin. In 1966, Brazil and Paraguay concluded the Iguaçu Act, announcing their intention to build a Brazilian–Paraguayan hydroelectric plant, Itaipú dam, on the Paraná River, on the Argentina–Brazil–Paraguay border. The Treaty of Itaipú was signed in Brasília in 1973. However, Buenos Aires feared that Brazil's project would hinder its own plans for the water resources development in the area. For almost a decade, the dispute soured bilateral relations and hampered efforts to forge closer economic and political links.

The dispute over water resources was finally resolved by intense diplomatic negotiations. In October 1979, the Itaipú–Corpus Multilateral Treaty on Technical Cooperation was concluded, ending the dispute to the satisfaction of all three neighbors and opening the way for a dramatic improvement in relations. After the conclusion of the Itaipu–Corpus Treaty, Brazilian president João Figueiredo visited Argentina, the first Brazilian leader to do so in more than four decades.

Figueiredo, the last president of the military rulers who had governed Brazil for 21 years, visited Buenos Aires in May 1980 and signed, among other agreements, a series of accords to collaborate on nuclear issues. Reflecting their shared opposition to the nuclear non-proliferation regime, Argentina and Brazil agreed to co-operate and exchange technical information, materials, and products on all aspects of the nuclear fuel cycle.

Following the resolution of the water resources dispute and the Brazilian president's successful visit, an unexpected and traumatic event took place in Argentina that further improved bilateral relations: the 1982 Falklands War.

==== Falklands War ====
Three years after calling off the Operation Soberanía to invade the Picton, Nueva and Lennox islands, Argentina invaded the Falkland Islands (Spanish: Islas Malvinas) in April 1982, starting a brief but important war with the United Kingdom. Brazil supported the Argentine claim over the Falkland Islands:

After reviewing the issue regarding the Falkland Islands, His Excellency the President of the Federative Republic of Brazil expressed the support of his Government to the Argentine Republic, reaffirming his belief that the negotiations in progress will yield satisfactory results within a brief amount of time.

— Ministry of External Relations of Brazil

However, when an RAF Vulcan Bomber was forced to land in Rio de Janeiro after attacking Stanley Airport, the Brazilian government refused to hand over crew as prisoners of war to Argentina and instead released them after a brief period of internment.

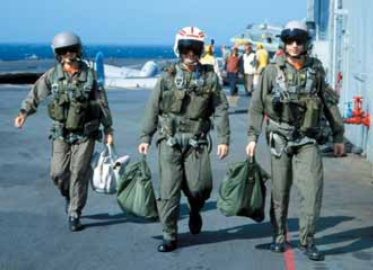
The crew of an Argentine Navy Grumman S-2 Tracker aboard the Brazilian aircraft carrier São Paulo (A12), in 2003.

After hostilities ended in June 1982, Buenos Aires chose Brazil to represent its interests in London until full diplomatic relations with United Kingdom were restored in 1990. Thus, despite rivalry and historical suspicions, Brazil's actions and policies during the most traumatic period of Argentina's recent history—objectionable military rule, near-conflict with Chile and the Falklands War—were fundamental to build trust between the two countries.

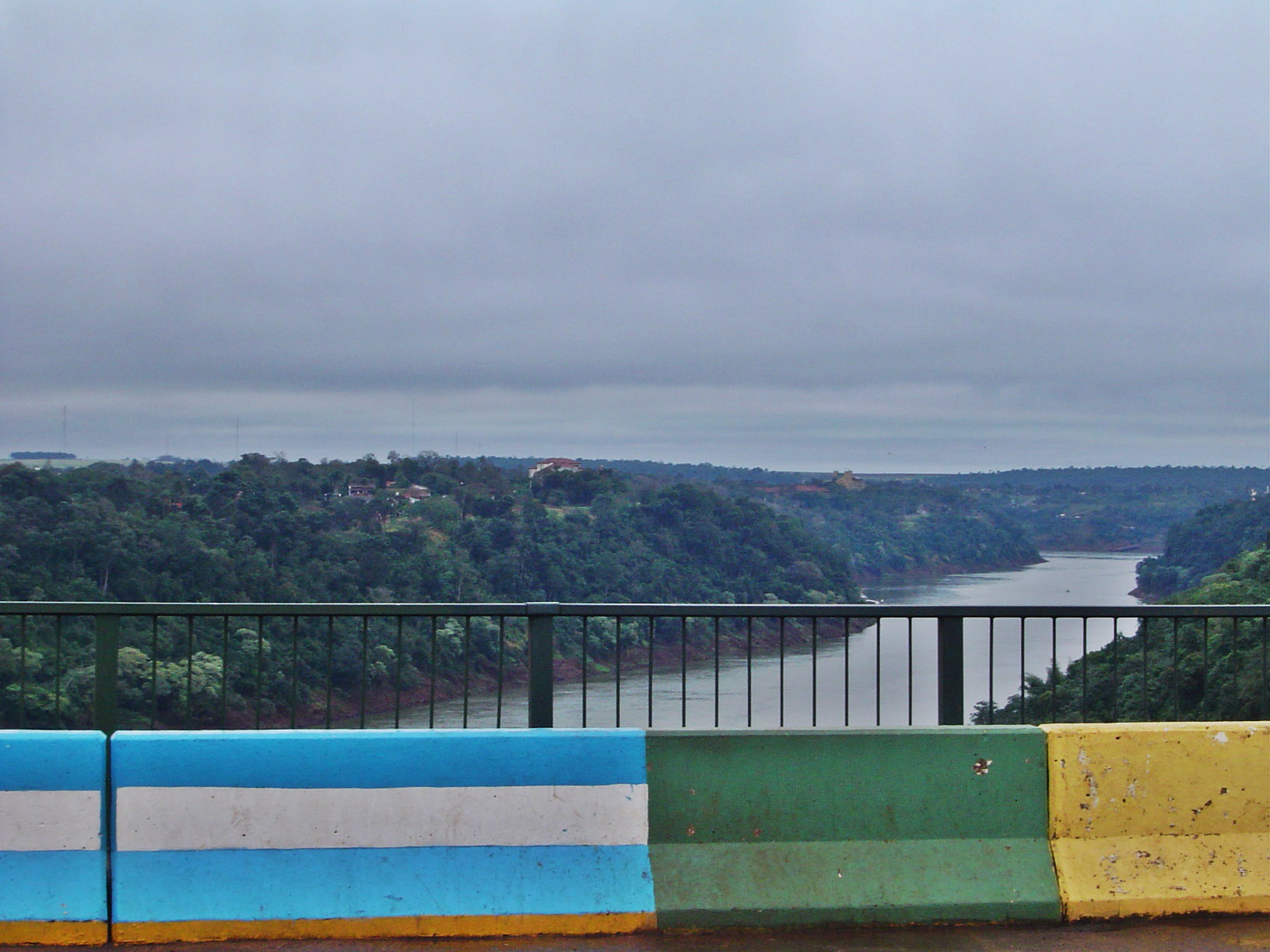
International border between Argentina (Puerto Iguazú) and Brazil (Foz do Iguaçú)

Argentina's defeat in the war against Britain hastened the end of its domestic military rule. General elections were held in October 1983, and President Raul Alfonsín was elected with a mandate to ensure that Argentina's recent past was not repeated. Among his main achievements, President Alfonsín started to resolve the enduring territorial conflict with Chile during his six-year term, and significantly improved relations with Brazil.

Argentina's intention to forge a closer relationship with Brazil was matched by Brazil's intention to do the same. While still under military rule, Brazil initiated a policy of improving relations with its South American neighbors, and Argentina was considered the key country in this effort. The initiative was accelerated after 1985 when José Sarney, became the first civilian president of Brazil since 1964. Soon after taking power, President Sarney met with President Alfonsín, and thereafter a series of diplomatic initiatives and presidential visits took place. The aim of these exchanges was to deepen the process of cultural, political, and economic rapprochement between Argentina and Brazil.

==== Return of democracy and deep integration (1985-2005) ====
After democratization, a strong integration and partnership began between the two countries. In 1985, they signed the basis for the Mercosur, a regional trade agreement.

In the field of science, the two regional giants had been rivals since the 1950s when both governments launched parallel nuclear and space programs, however, several agreements were signed since then such as the creation of the Brazilian-Argentine Agency for Accounting and Control of Nuclear Materials (ABACC) to verify both countries' pledges to use nuclear energy only for peaceful purposes.

Also on the military side there has been greater rapprochement. In accordance with the friendship policy, both armies dissolved or moved major units previously located at their common border (e.g. Argentine's 7th Jungle and 3rd Motorized Infantry Brigades). Brazilian soldiers are embedded in the Argentine peacekeeping contingent at UNFICYP in Cyprus and they are working together at MINUSTAH in Haiti and, as another example of collaboration, Argentine Navy aircraft routinely operates from the Brazilian Navy carrier NAe São Paulo.

=== Pink tide (2005–2015) ===
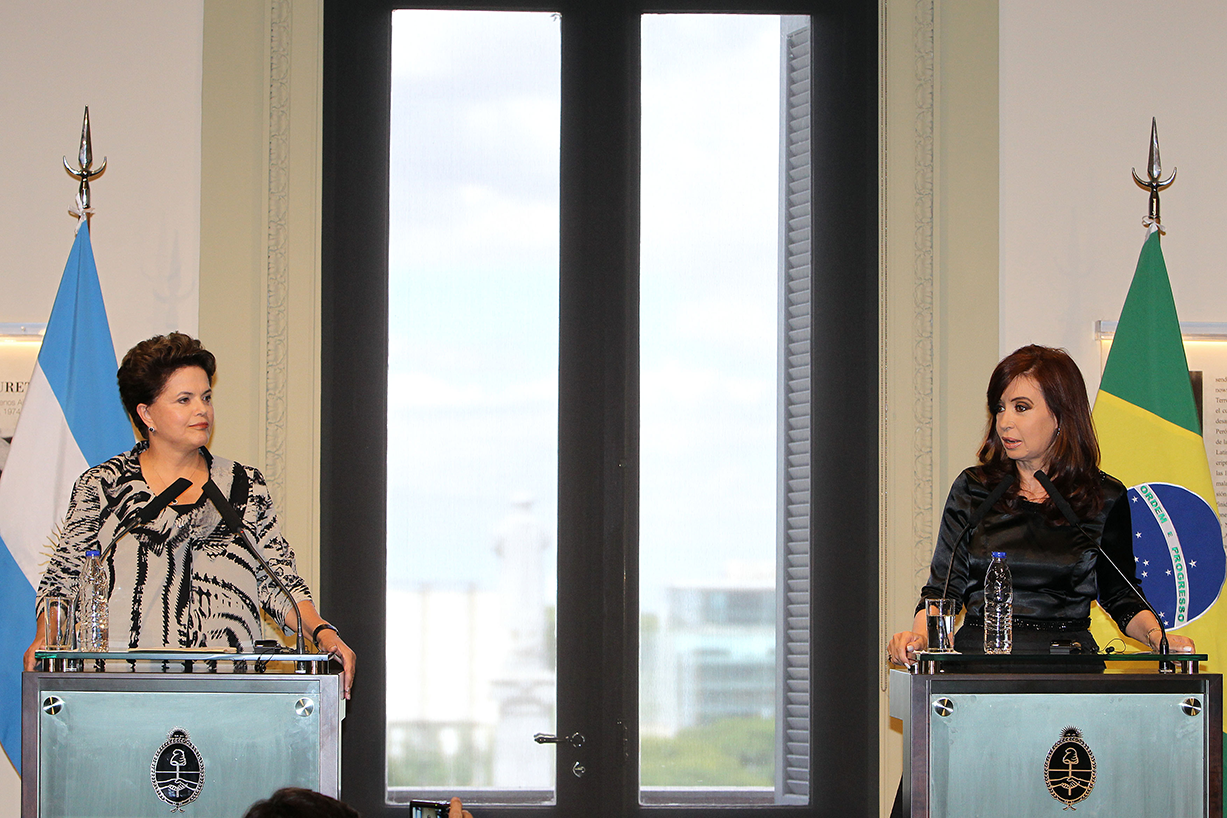
Former Presidents of Brazil and Argentina, Dilma Rousseff and Cristina Fernández de Kirchner in 2011

The Néstor Kirchner administration continued placing Brazil as a foreign policy priority and relations with Brazil were considered strategic. This was met with reciprocity in Brazil, as President Luiz Inácio Lula da Silva placed Argentina as the main priority of his foreign policy. The first foreign visit of Lula da Silva, as president-elect, was to Argentina in December 2002. From the Brazilian perspective, only with this strategic alliance would it be possible to transform South America into a world power bloc, one of the goals of Lula da Silva's foreign policy.

Since 2003, Argentina and Brazil have coordinated their positions in the multilateral fora, as can be seen by their joint participation in the agricultural negotiations at the WTO meeting in Cancún, their joint position in regards to the creation of the Free Trade Area of the Americas, and their articulation at the G-20 to reform the international financial system. The creation of the Union of South American Nations, in 2008, was a landmark in the new foreign policies of Brazil and Argentina. In another sign of mutual trust, since 2003, diplomats from both countries occupy a single seat in the United Nations Security Council when either of them hold a non-permanent seat.

In the economic arena, Argentina and Brazil dropped the U.S. dollar and started using their own currencies on all bilateral commercial transactions in 2008.

On 6 September 2008, the President of Argentina, Cristina Fernández de Kirchner, traveled to Brazil to consolidate relations between the two countries. She was the guest of honor at the Independence Day celebrations that took place on 7 September 2008 and witnessed the military parade in Brasília. The following day, she held discussions with President Lula on a variety of bilateral issues including energy, defense and nuclear cooperation.

On 28 October 2010, president Lula da Silva traveled to Buenos Aires to give his condolences for Néstor Kirchner's death. The Brazilian Government declared three days of national mourning.

"Our alliance with Brazil is indestructible"

— Foreign Minister Héctor Timerman.

President Dilma Rousseff chose Argentina as the first foreign trip of her presidency, in a demonstration of the "special and strategic" ties between the two countries. During her state visit to Buenos Aires on 31 January 2011, Rousseff stated that "it was not a casual decision to pick Argentina as my first foreign destination" and praised Argentina as a "strategic ally" to her country. "The Brazilian government assumes, once again, a true commitment with the Argentine government as well as a joint policy intended to promote a development strategy for the region. For me the main idea is that of a strategic relationship with Argentina, which should shine itself in all areas of interest of both countries", said Rousseff in conversations with local newspapers before arriving in Buenos Aires.

In those years, the strategic relationship between Argentina and Brazil was considered to be "at the highest point in history". Argentine foreign policy has given special emphasis in "deepening the strategic alliance with Brazil in all its aspects". Likewise, Argentina has been "an absolute priority" for Brazilian foreign policy.

=== Mercosur-EU Agreement (2015-2019) ===
During Mauricio Macri's administration in Argentina and Jair Bolsonaro's administrations in Brasil, the countries reached in principle the basis for the Mercosur-EU Free Trade Agreement which had been developing for twenty years.

=== Strained relations (2019–2022) ===
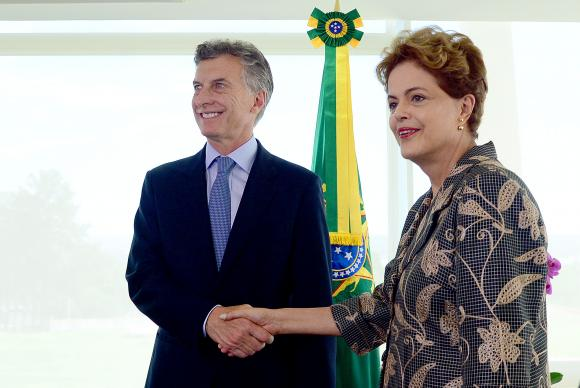
Argentine President Mauricio Macri with Brazilian President Dilma Rousseff in 2015. The victory of Macri in 2015 and the impeachment of Rousseff in 2016 pave the way to the Conservative Wave in late 2010s

Relations between Brazil and Argentina grew hostile due to deep ideological differences between the Brazilian right-wing president, Jair Bolsonaro, and the left-wing Alberto Fernández-Cristina Kirchner administration, mainly due to the Brazilian ruler's rejection of his Argentinian counterparts. Proof of the difficult relationship was shown during the 2019 Argentine general election, in which Bolsonaro showed all his support for his right-wing ally Mauricio Macri. Macri's re-election campaign resulted in his defeat, mostly by popular anger for his austere policies and ineffective presidency.

Initially, Bolsonaro announced that he would not appear at the inauguration of Fernández nor would he send a Brazilian representative. It showed the turbulent relationship between the two South American powers, where for the first time in 23 years there would be no Brazilian representation in the assumption of their main commercial ally, putting at risk the continuity of the organization of Mercosur, already almost non-existent due to the suspension of Venezuela during Maduro's dictatorship. Days later, he decided to send Brazilian vice-president, Hamilton Mourão as representative. Another cause of discussion between each presidents are the relations between their sons; Fernandez's son is known in Argentina as a drag performer and cosplayer, with a progressive stance, while Bolsonaro's sons are conservative and homophobic.

During the COVID-19 pandemic in Brazil, Bolsonaro is frequently questioned for his handling of the situation and his management of the country's health system, and compared to his Argentine counterpart. Bolsonaro has attacked Argentina's handling of COVID-19 and described Argentina as being a country that is "heading towards socialism", comparing it negatively with countries such as Cuba and Venezuela, while identifying his own COVID-19 strategy with Sweden. At the time that Bolsonaro made these comments, Brazil had recorded 66 COVID-19 deaths per 1 million inhabitants, more than seven times Argentina's rate of 8 recorded COVID-19 deaths per 1 million inhabitants and Cuba's rate of 7 recorded COVID-19 deaths per 1 million inhabitants.

In July 2020, the Mercosur summit began via videoconference, where the coldness of both presidents was shown; they did not speak each other and Férnandez made an indirect insult addressing Bolsonaro. The main reason that produces constant clashes between both countries is the continuous intrusion of Bolsonaro and his sons in Argentina's internal affairs, either haranguing against the policies of President Fernández or fueling differences between the two countries, such as economic, political, social and sports matters; and the diplomatic apathy of Argentina, whom showed reluctant in cooperating or improving relations.

=== Slight improvement and all-time-low relations (2023–present) ===
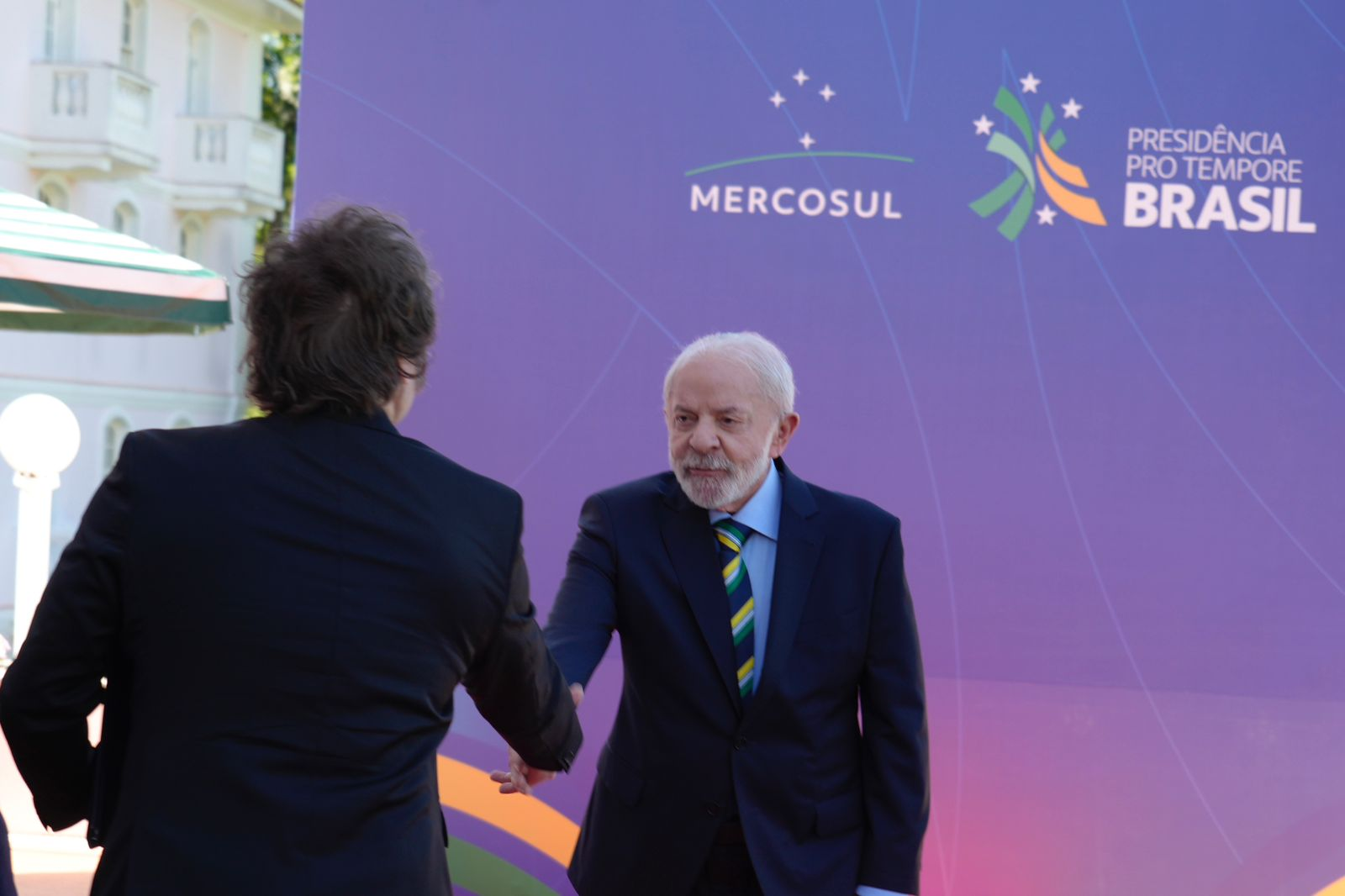
Milei shaking hand with Lula in December 2025

Relations began improving following Brazil's election of Lula in its 2022 general election. Lula took his first international visit to Argentina. In January 2023, Lula and Fernández announced plans for greater economic integration, including preliminary talks regarding the development of a common currency.

However, the election of right-wing Javier Milei as Argentina's new president in December 2023, raised once again a new ideological distance between Argentina's and Brasil's left wing president, deteriorating the already broken relations between both countries to the lowest of their history.

== Current issues ==
=== Military cooperation ===
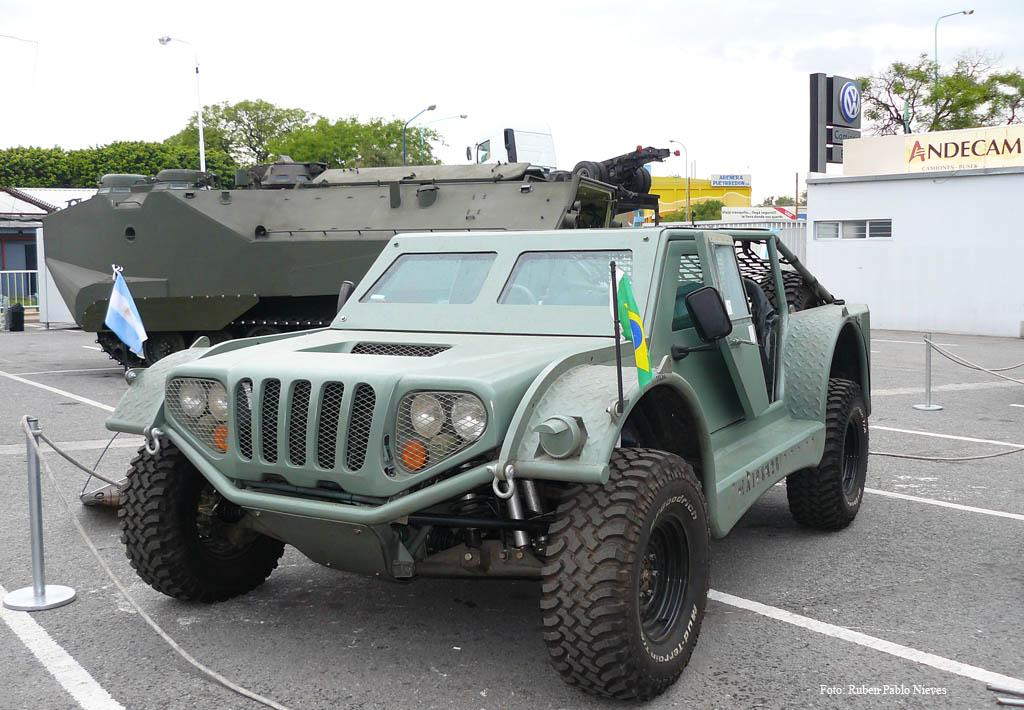
Armored version of the "Gaucho" vehicle

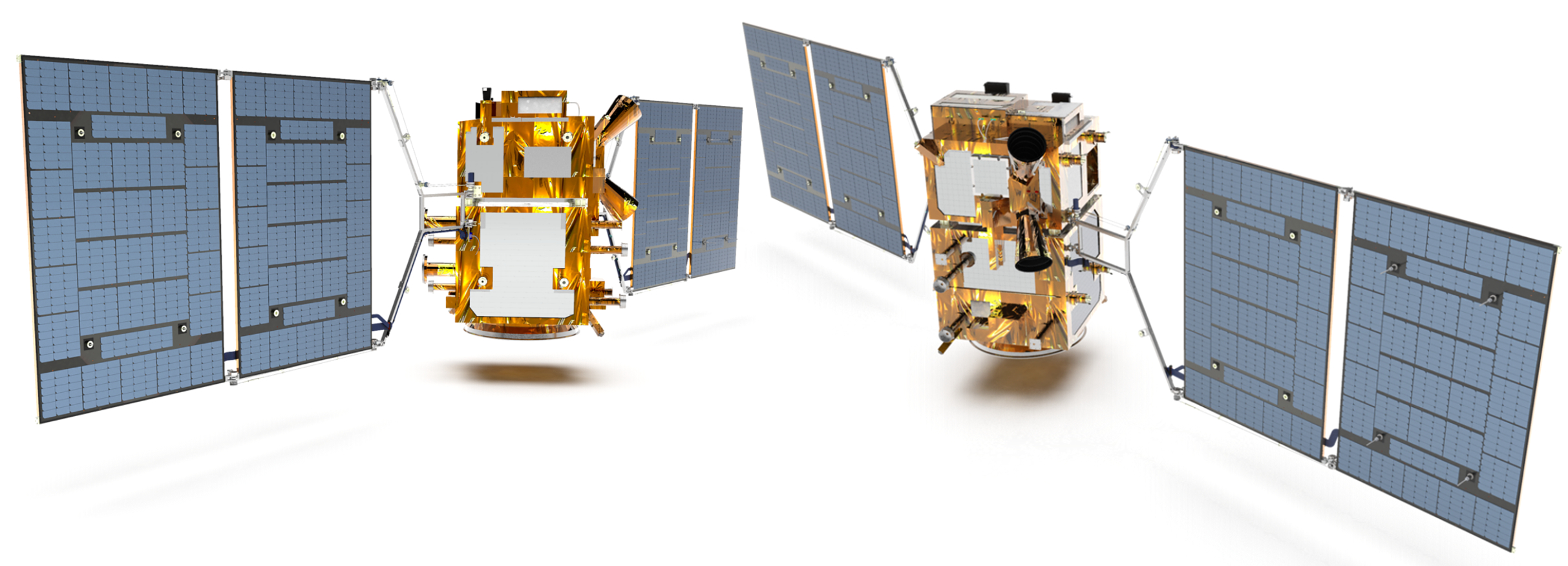
The SABIA-Mar, scheduled to be launched in 2022, is a Brazilian/Argentine earth observation satellite.

Brazil and Argentina are engaged in several joint venture projects in the military field, such as the Gaucho armored vehicle and the Embraer KC-390 military transport aircraft. The Gaucho is a Light Strike Vehicle capable of reconnaissance, air assault, command and control, transport and evacuation missions. The Gaucho project started in 2004 and entered production in 2006. Argentina is responsible for the design and construction of the chassis, engine mounts, transmission, steering and suspension. Brazil, for its part, developed and installed the brake system, engine, transmission and transfer case, as well as the cooling system, electrical system, fuel, armament and accessories.

Brazil and Argentina have also entered a partnership to jointly develop the KC-390 twin-engine military transport aircraft. Argentina has agreed to manufacture KC-390 components and possibly purchase six of the aircraft.

The Argentine Army has shown interest in a possible version of the 8x8 armored vehicles VBTP-MR Guaraní developed by the Brazilian Army with the support of Iveco. The Argentine military are also operators of the Brazilian military Agrale Marruá vehicle.

=== Scientific cooperation ===
Argentina and Brazil have close cooperation in the field of space science – the National Space Activities Commission of Argentina and the Brazilian Space Agency have been working together since the 1990s. In 2007, Brazil and Argentina successfully launched a rocket into space, in the first joint space mission by the two countries. The VS-30 rocket was launched from the Barreira do Inferno Launch Center and carried experiments from both countries.

The Brazilian–Argentine Agency for Accounting and Control of Nuclear Materials was created in 1991. During President Lula's state visit to Buenos Aires on 22 February 2008, the two countries established a binational commission on pursuing joint uranium enrichment for nuclear energy purposes.

=== Falkland Islands ===
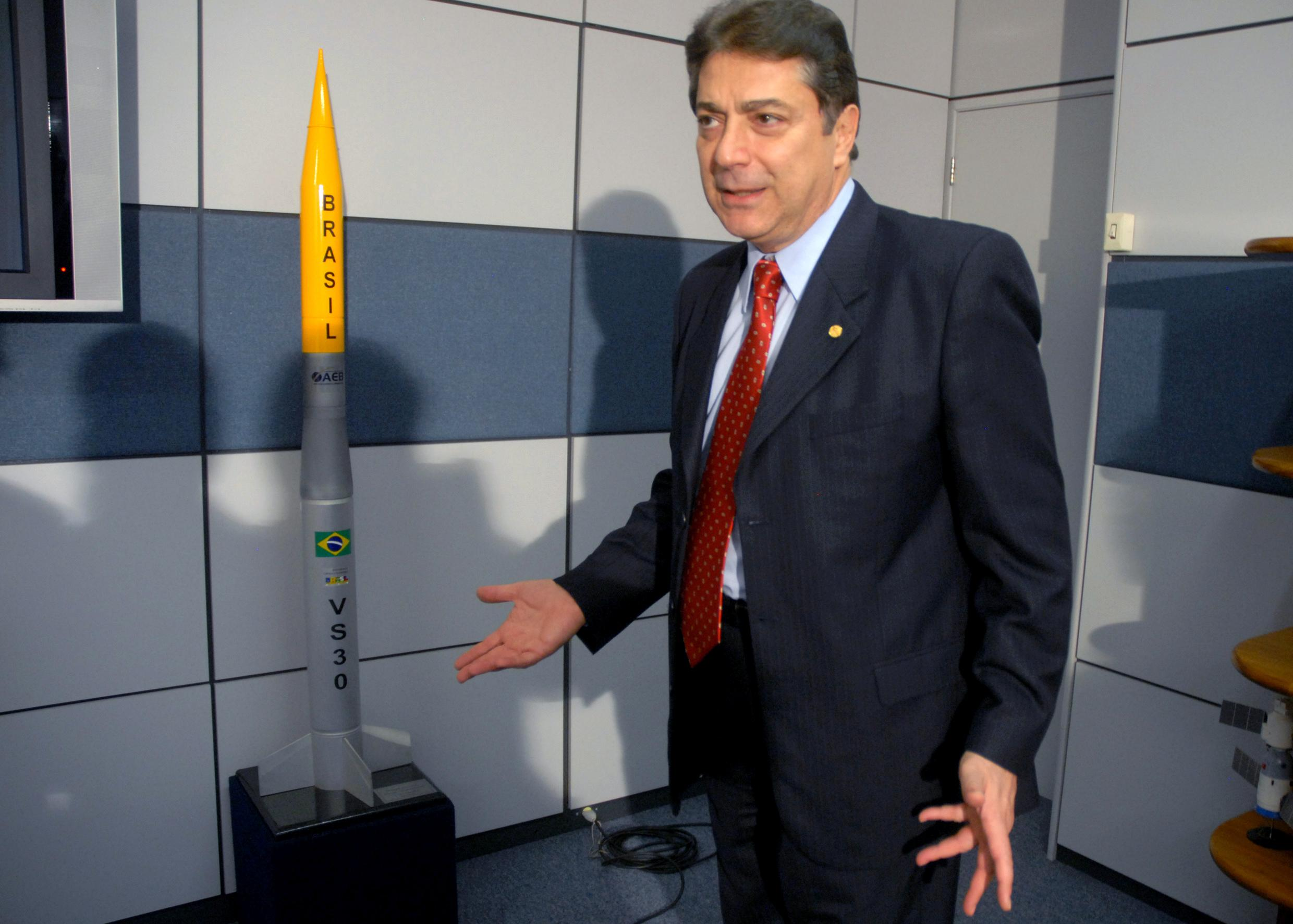
The VS-30, Argentina and Brazil cooperated on this sounding rocket.

The Brazilian government has been a strong supporter of the Argentine claim over the Falkland Islands – which both countries term Malvinas (Brazil: Ilhas Malvinas / Argentina: Islas Malvinas).

In a joint communiqué issued by the Brazilian and Argentine governments on 3 August 2010, "the President of the Federative Republic of Brazil reiterated the support of his country to the legitimate rights of Argentina in the sovereignty dispute regarding the Falkland Islands, South Georgia and South Sandwich Islands and the surrounding maritime areas". The Brazilian government also claimed that exploration of offshore oil reserves carried out by the United Kingdom in the Argentine Sea is "illegal" and "inconsistent with what determines the United Nations".

Brazilian authorities have also voiced their support for the Argentine claim at the multilateral fora, including the United Nations (UN), the Rio Group, Mercosur, the Organization of American States, and the Union of South American Nations. Brazil has criticized the UN over its stance on the dispute, and accused the United Kingdom of using its status as permanent member of the UN's Security Council to prevent the debate from being reopened.

In accordance with a resolution adopted at the 2010 South American Summit prohibiting British vessels operating under the "illegal flag of the Malvinas (Falkland Islands)" from docking at South American ports, the Brazilian government denied the Royal Navy patrol boat HMS Clyde access to Rio de Janeiro on 11 January 2011. In a statement, the Brazilian Minister of Defense, Nelson Jobim, noted that Brazil "recognizes Argentine sovereignty over the Malvinas and not the British claim" and therefore "will not authorize any requests made from British ships or aircraft in military operations in the Falklands".

== Economic relations ==
=== Trade ===
Brazil accounts for Argentina's largest export and import market, while Argentina accounts for Brazil's fourth largest export and import market. Total trade between the two countries amounted to the sum of US$22.5 billion in 2016. Argentine exports to Brazil amounted to US$9.1 billion while Brazilian exports to Argentina totaled US$13.4 billion. In recent years, trade between the two countries decreased as commodity prices fell and Brazil experienced slower economic growth.

	2004	2005	2006	2007	2008	2009	2010
(Argentina) Argentine exports to Brazil	$5.6 billion	$6.2 billion	$8 billion	$10.4 billion	$13.3 billion	$11.3 billion	$14.4 billion
(Brazil) Brazilian exports to Argentina	$7.4 billion	$9.9 billion	$11.7 billion	$14.4 billion	$17.6 billion	$12.8 billion	$18.5 billion
Total trade	$13 billion	$16.1 billion	$19.7 billion	$24.8 billion	$30.9 billion	$24.1 billion	$32.9 billion
Note: All values are in U.S. dollars. Source: MRE/SECEX.

==== Avoid US Dollar ====
On 2 May 2023, the presidents of Argentina and Brazil have announced plans to continue working on the development of a mechanism allowing them to avoid using the US dollar in bilateral trade. The proposed plan involves a line of credit to finance Brazilian companies that export to Argentina with the intention of avoiding use of the dollar.

=== Investment ===
Argentina is the main destination for Brazilian investment in South America. Brazilian investments in Argentina are mostly in oil, cement, mining, steel, textiles, cosmetics, banks, food, and beverages. According to the United Nations Economic Commission for the Americas and the Caribbean, forty percent of direct investment in Argentina comes from Brazil.

== Common memberships ==
Argentina and Brazil both hold membership in a number of multinational organizations, including:

- Food and Agriculture Organization
- Fédération Internationale de l'Automobile (FIA)
- G-20 major economies
- International Chamber of Commerce
- International Monetary Fund (IMF)
- Interpol
- Mercosur
- Organization of American States (OAS)
- United Nations (UN)
- UNESCO
- World Health Organization (WHO)
- World Trade Organization (WTO)
- World Bank

== Sports ==
=== Football ===
Both Argentina and Brazil men's national teams are the most prominent members of the CONMEBOL being very successful teams and being the two South American teams with most appearances in the FIFA World Cup, and facing in the Copa América, with Brazil and Argentina facing each other in major tournaments, it sparked a rivalry between them.

== State visits ==
Since 2003, Presidential meetings are held every six months alternately in each country, and besides those there are more for other reasons (UNASUR, Mercosur, G20, etc.).

Recent visits by the President of Brazil to Argentina

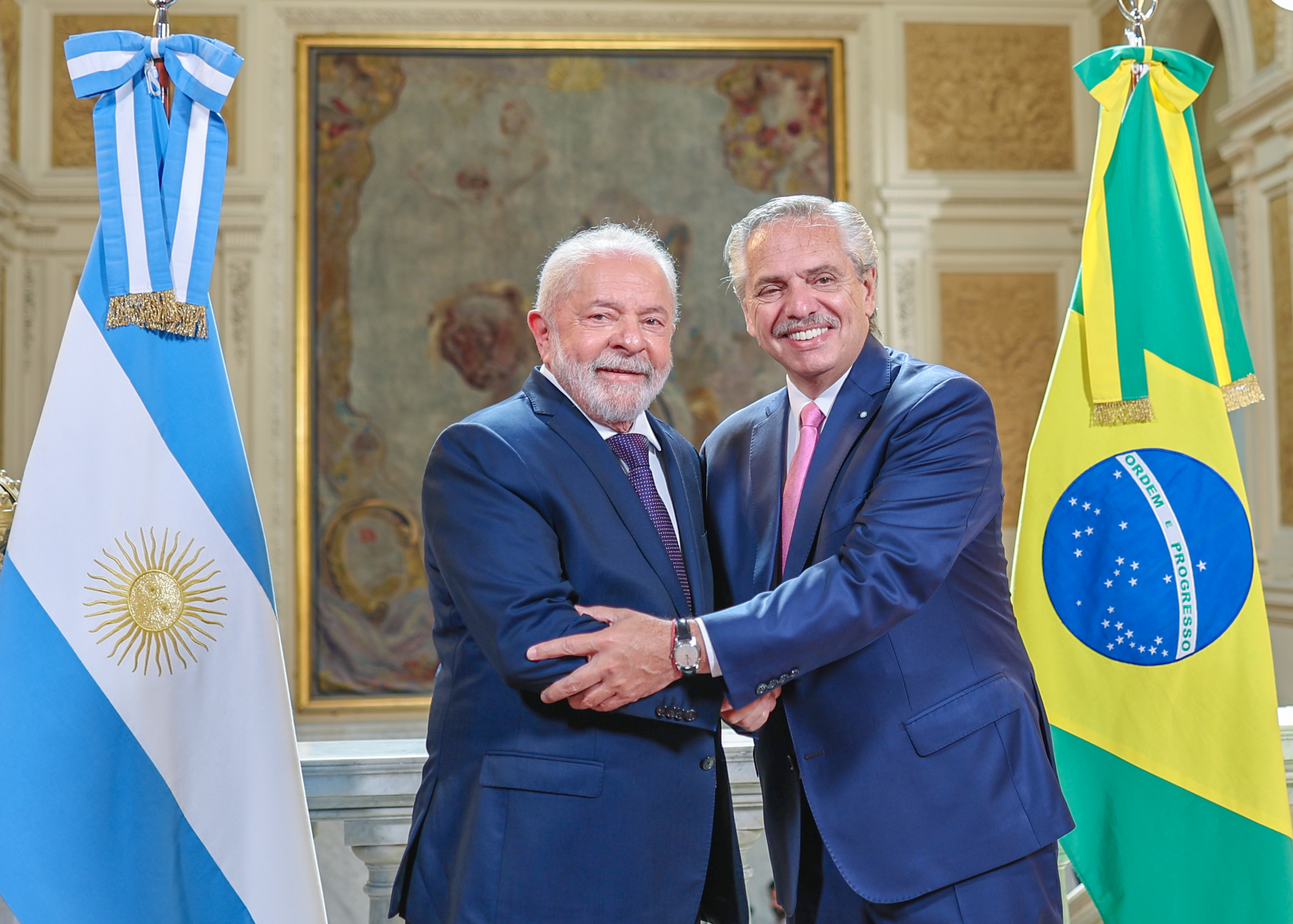
President Lula da Silva and President Alberto Fernández in 2023.

- Luiz Inácio Lula da Silva
  - 22–25 May 2003, Buenos Aires – Inauguration of Néstor Kirchner as President of Argentina
  - 15–18 October 2003, Buenos Aires and El Calafate – Official state visit
  - 7–8 July 2004, Puerto Iguazú – Mercosur summit and private meeting with President Néstor Kirchner
  - 4–5 November 2005, Mar del Plata – 4th Summit of the Americas
  - 30 November 2005, Puerto Iguazú – Presidential meeting with Néstor Kirchner
  - 4 May 2006, Puerto Iguazú – Quadripartite meeting between the heads of state of Brazil, Argentina, Bolivia and Venezuela
  - 20–21 July 2006, Córdoba – Mercosur summit
  - 26–27 April 2007, Buenos Aires – Official state visit
  - 9–10 December 2007, Buenos Aires – First Inauguration of Cristina Fernández de Kirchner as President of Argentina
  - 21–23 February 2008, Buenos Aires – Official state visit
  - 30 June 1 July 2008, San Miguel de Tucumán – Mercosur and Unasur summits and private meeting with President Cristina Fernández de Kirchner
  - 3–4 August 2008, Buenos Aires – Official state visit
  - 22–23 April 2009, Buenos Aires – Official state visit
  - 27–28 August 2009, Bariloche – UNASUR summit and private meeting with President Cristina Fernández de Kirchner
  - 3–4 May 2010, Buenos Aires – UNASUR summit and private meeting with President Cristina Fernández de Kirchner
  - 25 May 2010, Buenos Aires – Guest at the Argentine bicentennial celebration
  - 2–3 August 2010, San Juan – Mercosur summit and private meeting with Cristina Fernández de Kirchner
  - 27 October 2010, Buenos Aires, Death and state funeral of Néstor Kirchner
- Dilma Rousseff
  - 31 January 2011, Buenos Aires – Official state visit
  - 10 December 2011, Buenos Aires – Second Inauguration of Cristina Fernández de Kirchner as president.
  - 28–29 June 2012, Mendoza – 43rd Summit of Mercosur
  - 28 November 2012, Buenos Aires – Official state visit
  - 10 December 2015, Buenos Aires – Inauguration of Mauricio Macri as President
- Luiz Inácio Lula da Silva
  - 23–24 January 2023, Buenos Aires – Official state visit

Recent visits by the President of Argentina to Brazil

- Eduardo Duhalde
  - 14 January 2003, Brasília, DF – Official state visit
- Néstor Kirchner
  - 11 June 2003, Brasília, DF – Official state visit
  - 15–16 March 2004, Brasília, DF – Official state visit
  - 9 May 2005, Brasília, DF – South America-Arab Countries summit and private meeting with President Luiz Inácio Lula da Silva
  - 18–19 January 2006, Brasília, DF – Official state visit
  - 25–26 April 2006, Brasília, DF – Presidential meeting with Luiz Inácio Lula da Silva
- Cristina Fernández de Kirchner
  - 23 May 2008, Brasília, DF – 1st UNASUL summit
  - 6–8 September 2008, Brasília, DF – Official state visit
  - 20 March 2009, São Paulo, SP – Presidential meeting with Luiz Inácio Lula da Silva
  - 18 November 2009, Brasília, DF – Presidential meeting with Luiz Inácio Lula da Silva
  - 29 July 2011, Brasilia, DF – New Argentine embassy opening ceremony
  - 7 December 2012, Brasilia, DF – Presidential meeting with Dilma Rousseff
  - 14–16 July 2014, Fortaleza, CE – 6th BRICS Summit
  - 13–16 July 2015, Brasilia, DF – 2015 Mercosur Summit
- Mauricio Macri
  - 16 January 2019, Brasilia, DF – Official state Visit

== Resident diplomatic missions ==
Of Argentina

- Brasília (Embassy)
- Belo Horizonte (Consulate-General)
- Porto Alegre (Consulate-General)
- Rio de Janeiro (Consulate-General)
- São Paulo (Consulate-General)
- Curitiba (Consulate)
- Florianópolis (Consulate)
- Foz do Iguaçu (Consulate)
- Recife (Consulate)
- Salvador da Bahia (Consulate)
- Uruguaiana (Consulate)

Of Brazil

- Buenos Aires (Embassy)
- Buenos Aires (Consulate-General)
- Córdoba (Consulate-General)
- Mendoza (Consulate-General)
- Paso de los Libres (Consulate)
- Puerto Iguazú (Consulate)

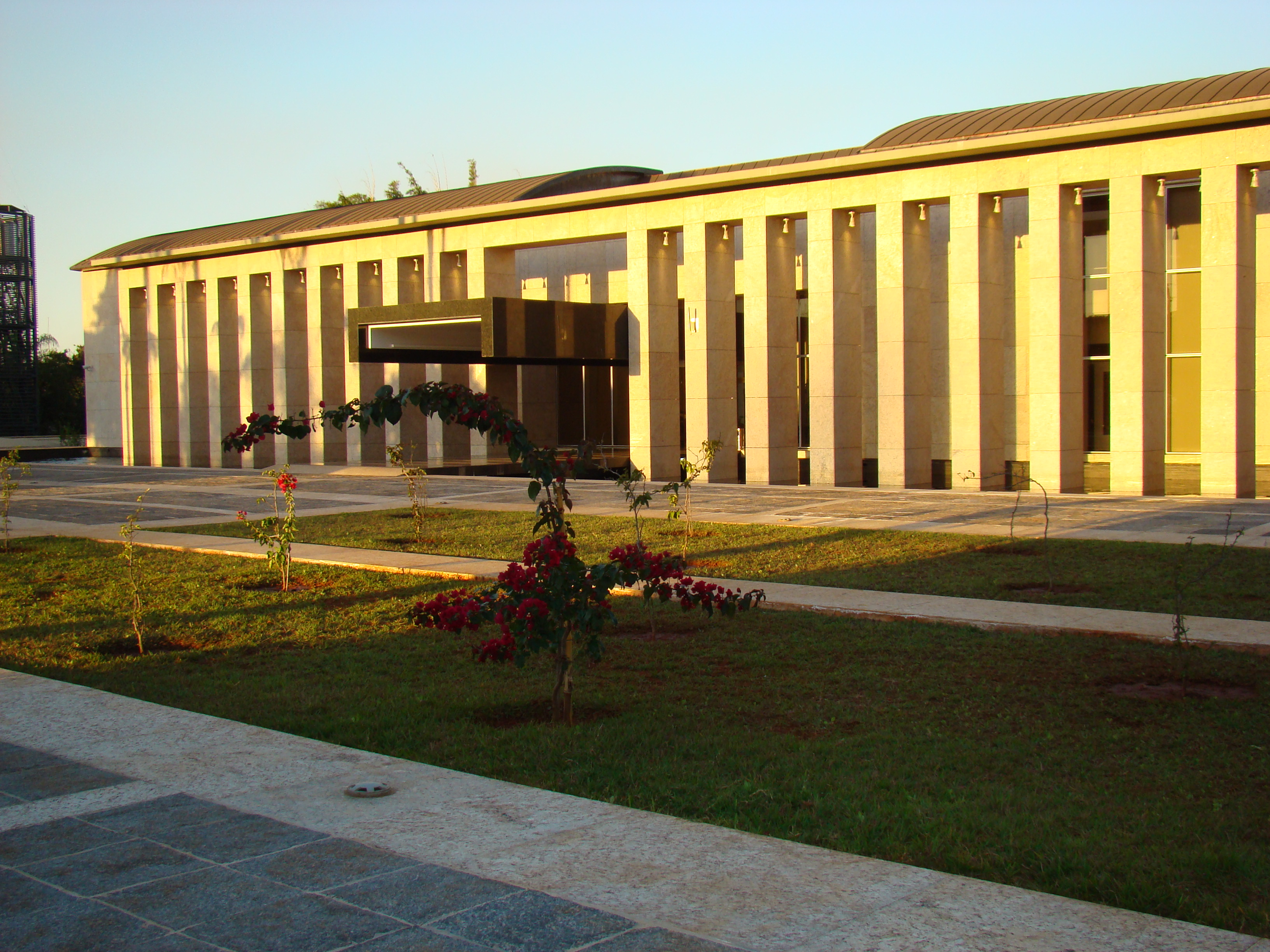
Embassy of Argentina in Brasília

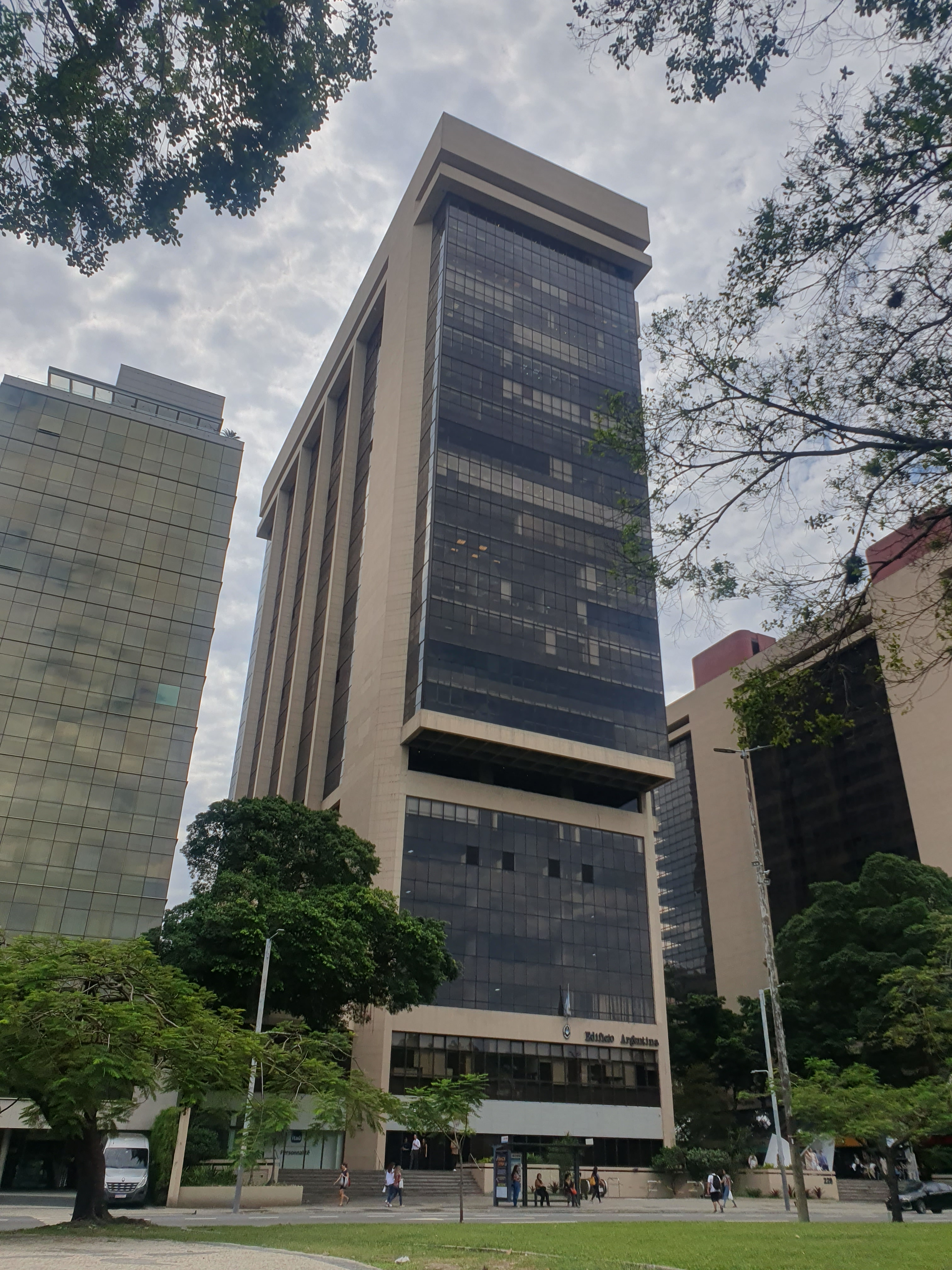
Building hosting the Consulate-General of Argentina in Rio de Janeiro

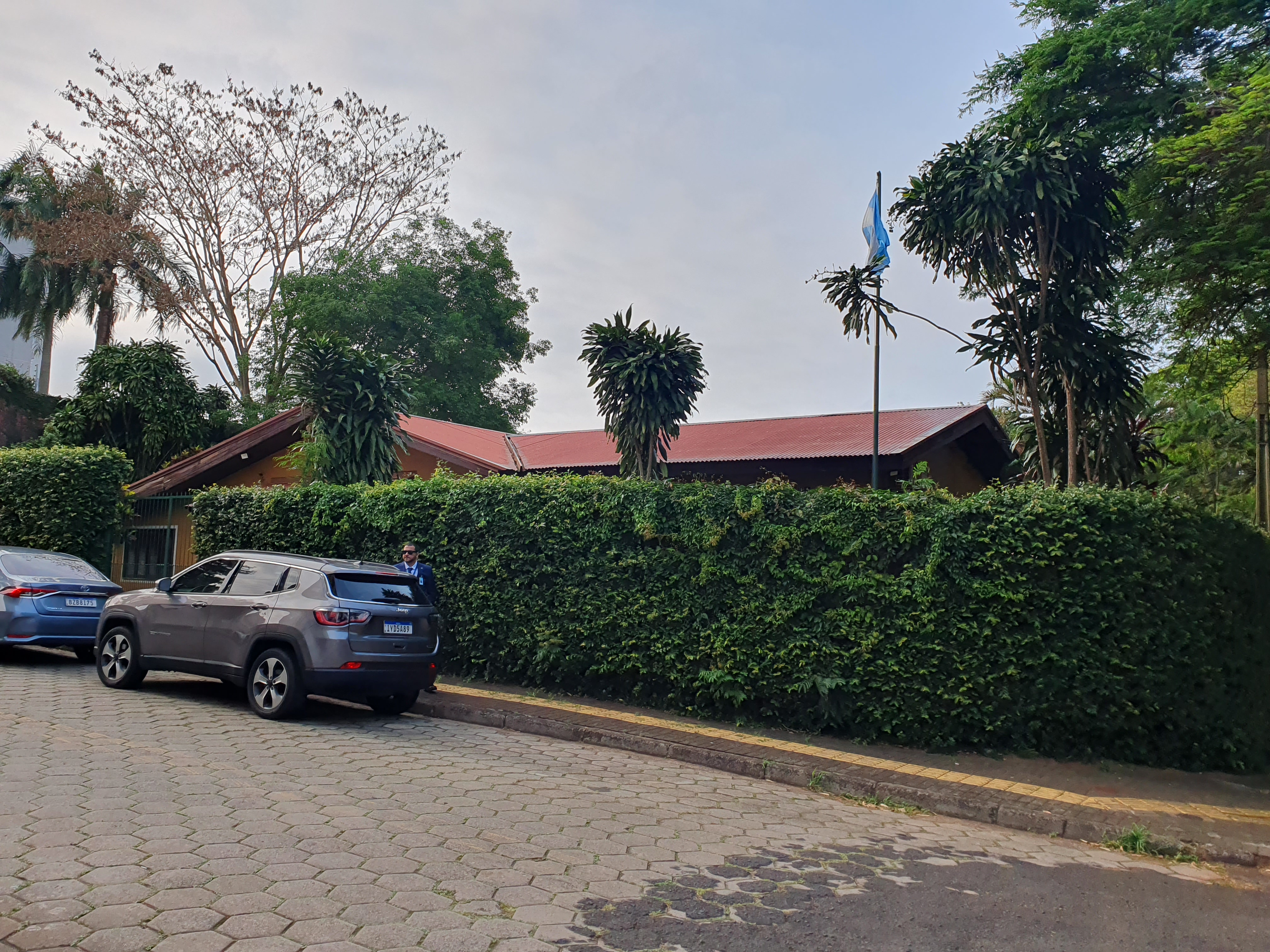
Consulate of Argentina in Foz do Iguaçu
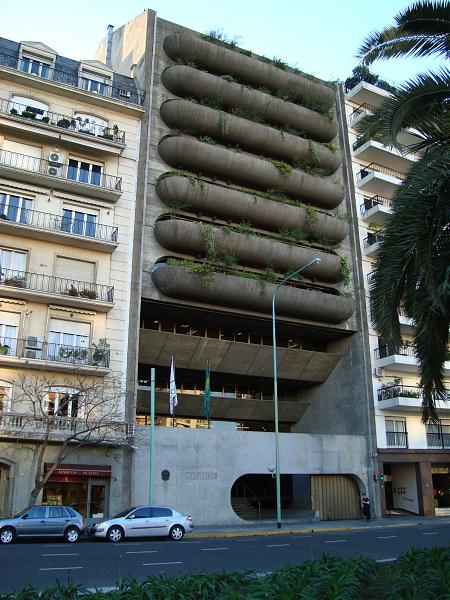
Embassy of Brazil in Buenos Aires

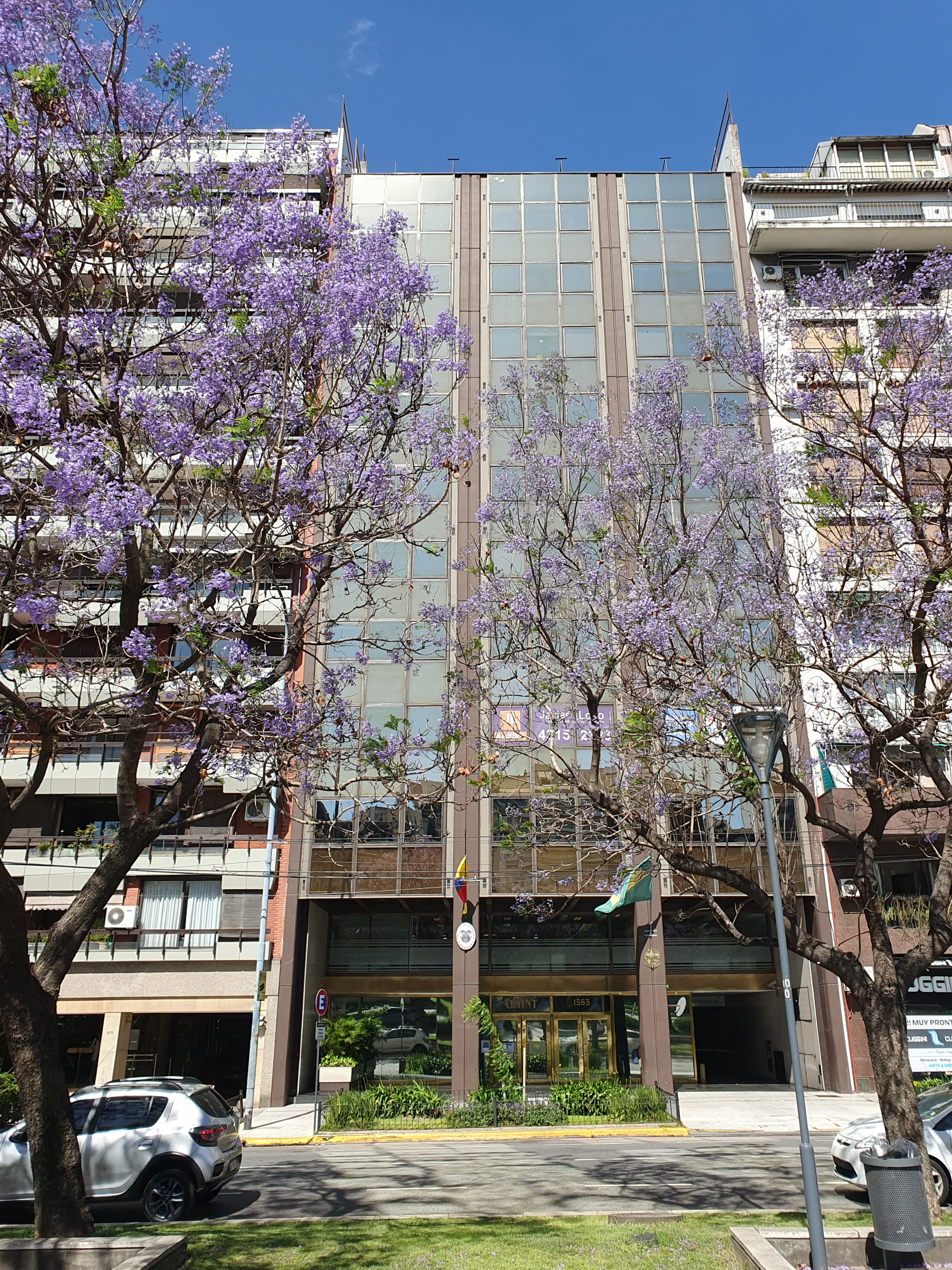
Building hosting the Consulate-General of Brazil in Buenos Aires

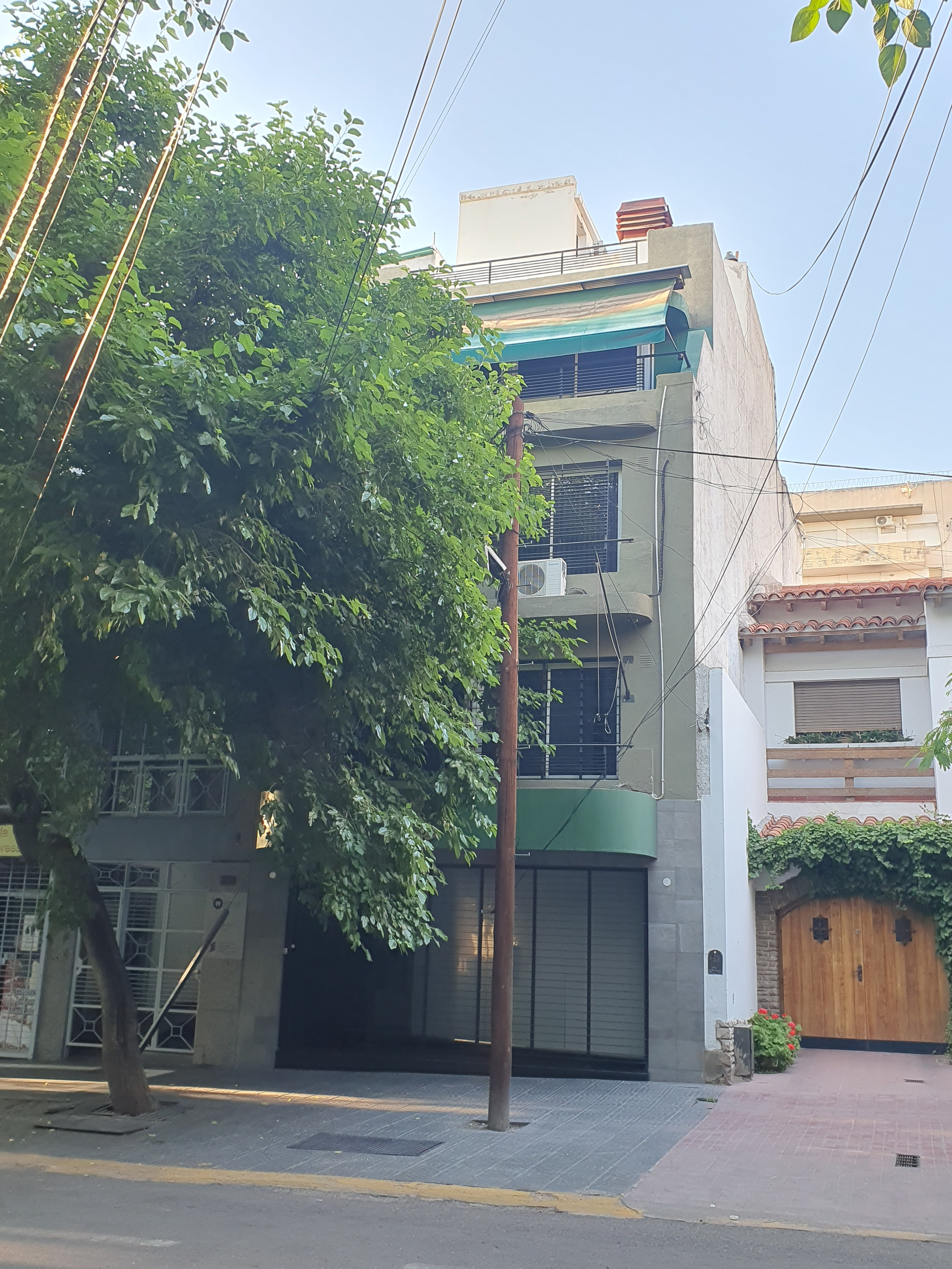
Consulate-General of Brazil in Mendoza

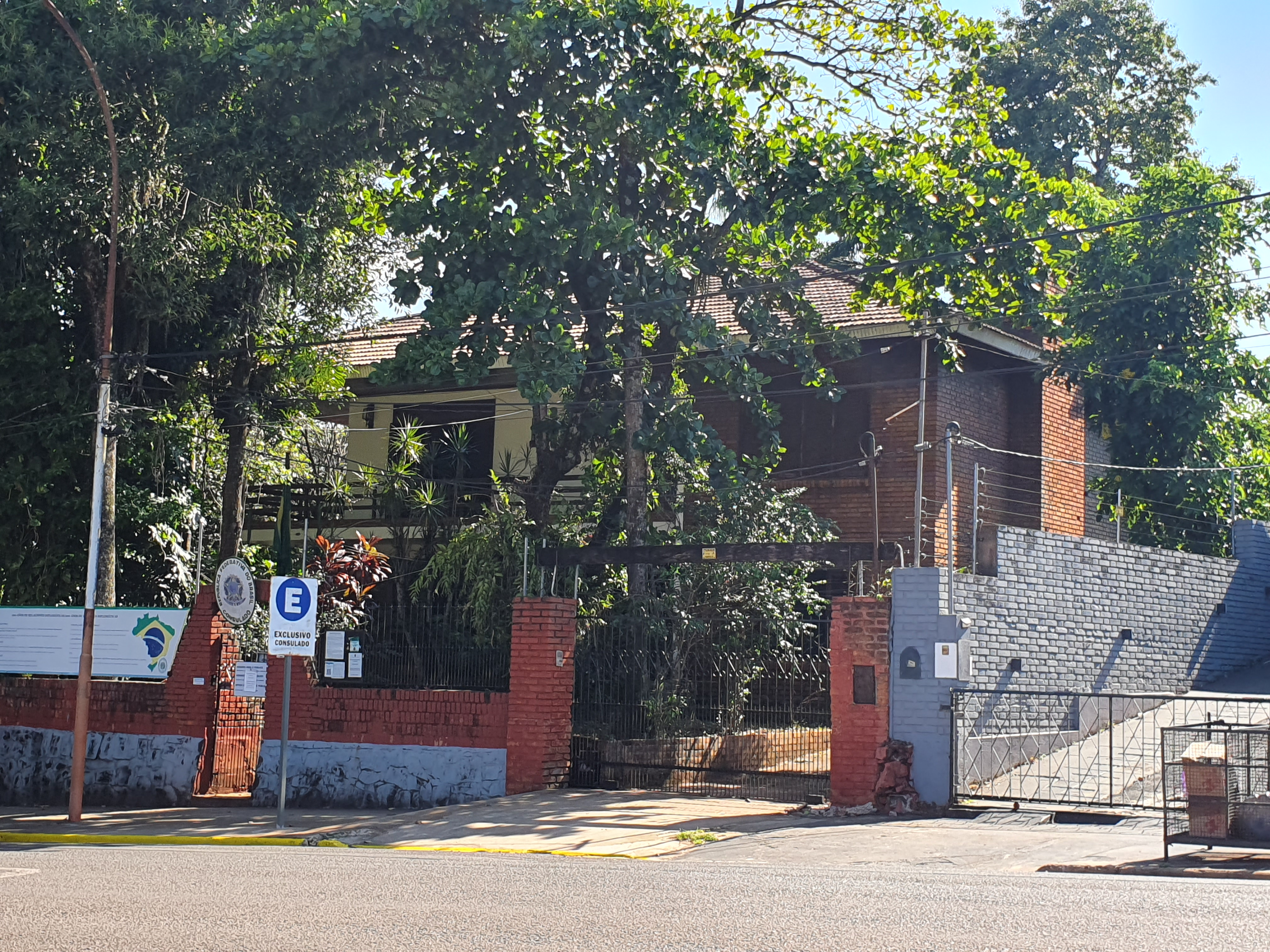
Consulate of Brazil in Puerto Iguazú

== See also ==
- Argentine Brazilian
- Foreign relations of Argentina
- Foreign relations of Brazil
- Mercosul
- Union of South American Nations
- Argentina and Brazil football rivalry
