= Rio Group =

International political association

- Successor: Community of Latin American and Caribbean States
- Established: 1986
- Dissolved: 2011
- Members: 24 Latin American and Caribbean states

The Rio Group (G-Rio) was a permanent association of political consultation of Latin America and Caribbean countries, created in Rio de Janeiro, Brazil on December 18, 1986 with the purpose of creating a better political relationship among the countries. It was succeeded in 2011 by the Community of Latin American and Caribbean States.

The first countries to be members of this organization were Argentina, Brazil, Colombia, Mexico, Panama, Peru, Uruguay, and Venezuela, the same members of the Contadora Group (Mexico, Colombia and Panama) and the Contadora Support Group (Argentina, Brazil, Peru, and Uruguay) which is also known as the Group of Lima or Group of Eight. The purpose of this group was to strengthen the political relationships and some issues among Latin American and Caribbean countries, this group was based on consultations of common interest such as the Latin American unity, by 2010 the Rio Group was composed by 23 countries and 1 representative from the Eastern Caribbean. On July 29, 1985, Argentina, Peru, and Uruguay announced the creation of the Contadora Support Group or Lima Group, which together with the Contadora Group was known as the Group of Eight.

In 1983, the governments of Mexico, Colombia, Panama, and Venezuela established a system to promote peace in Central America. On June 6, 1986, The Central American countries visited Panama and signed the Contadora Act for peace and cooperation of Central America in which they signed to strengthen peace and cooperation among the peoples of the region and improve political confidence among the Central American countries caused by border incidents such as the arms race, arms trafficking, among others. this was also signed to restore economic development and cooperation in Central America and thus be able to negotiate better access to international markets.

== Goals ==
- Political cooperation among the governments of member countries.
- Examine and solve international issues.
- Promote the best function and coordination of Latin American organizations.
- Present solutions for problems that affect the region.
- Improving inter-American relations.
- New fields of cooperation that favor economic, social, scientific and technological development.

== Member states ==
Member states/organizations in alphabetical order by column:

- Argentina
- Belize
- Bolivia
- Brazil
- Chile
- Colombia
- Costa Rica
- Cuba (admitted November 2008)
- Dominican Republic
- Ecuador
- El Salvador
- Guatemala
- Guyana
- Haiti
- Honduras
- Jamaica
- Mexico
- Nicaragua
- Panama
- Paraguay
- Peru
- Suriname
- Uruguay
- Venezuela

== List of summit meetings ==
Summit	Year	City	Seat country
I	1987	Acapulco	Mexico
II	1988	Montevideo	Uruguay
III	1989	Ica	Peru
IV	1990	Caracas	Venezuela
V	1991	Cartagena	Colombia
VI	1992	Buenos Aires	Argentina
VII	1993	Santiago	Chile
VIII	1994	Rio de Janeiro	Brazil
IX	1995	Quito	Ecuador
X	1996	Cochabamba	Bolivia
XI	1997	Asunción	Paraguay
XII	1998	Panama City	Panama
XIII	1999	Veracruz	Mexico
XIV	2000	Cartagena	Colombia
XV	2001	Santiago	Chile
XVI	2002	San José	Costa Rica
XVII	2003	Cusco	Peru
XVIII	2004	Rio de Janeiro	Brazil
XIX	2007	Georgetown	Guyana
XX	2008	Santo Domingo	Dominican Republic
I Extraordinaria	2009	Zacatecas	Mexico
II Extraordinaria	2009	Managua	Nicaragua
XXI	2010	Cancún	Mexico

== Institutional Ministerial Meetings with the European Union ==
The Rio Group and the European Union maintains an institutionalized dialogue, based on the 1990 Rome Declaration.

Summit	Year	Month	Date	City	Country
I	1991	April	26-27	Luxembourg City	Luxembourg
II	1992	May	28-29	Santiago	Chile
III	1993	April	23-24	Copenhagen	Denmark
IV	1994	April	22-23	São Paulo	Brazil
V	1995	March	17	Paris	France
VI	1996	April	15-16	Cochabamba	Bolivia
VII	1997	April	7-8	Noordwijk	Netherlands
VIII	1998	February	11-12	Panama	Panama
IX	2000	February	24	Vilamoura	Portugal
X	2001	March	28	Santiago	Chile
XI	2003	April	24-25	Vouliagmeni	Greece

== Rio Group ministers meet in Brasilia ==
Foreign ministers of the group of Rio gathered for a two-day meeting to discuss issues including the political situation in Haiti, and to make preparations for the group's 18th summit set for November 4–5. During the meeting, Celso Amorim said that the Brazilian troops are taking part in the United Nations Stabilization Mission for Haiti (MINUSTAH). He discussed the integration of South and Latin America, and said that the Rio Group could play an important role in facilitating the reinsertion of Cuba into the family of Latin America.

Amorim also said “The Group of Rio has developed its capability to address new issues, mostly economic and cooperation ones, and is now serving as an important mechanism for dialogue.”

During the meeting in Nov 4-5 in Rio de Janeiro, the group discuss the effects of globalization on Latin America countries. By this time Rio Group comprises 19 countries, including Argentina, Bolivia, Chile, Colombia, Costa Rica, Dominican Republic, Ecuador, El Salvador, Guatemala, Honduras, Mexico, Nicaragua, Panama, Paraguay, Peru, Uruguay, and Venezuela.

== The Cancun Summit and the renovation of Rio Group ==
=== Carlos Federico Domínguez Ávila ===
During the meeting of presidents of Latin America and the Caribbean in Cancun, Mexico, the presidents discussed the renewal and recomposition of the Permanent Mechanism for Consultation and Political Coordination, also known as the Rio Group. The Rio Group was created in 1986 in Rio de Janeiro, Brazil by representatives of eight countries, by 2010 the Rio Group was composed by 23 countries and 1 representative from the Eastern Caribbean. One of the most important virtues of the Rio Group was Meridian 47n. 115, Feb.2010 [p. 27-28] the only Political and diplomatic forum that brings together all 33 states that make up “America”.

== See also ==
- Organization of American States
- Union of South American Nations
- Organization of Ibero-American States
- Ibero-American Summit
- Inter-American Treaty of Reciprocal Assistance
