= Condor (Argentine missile) =

Space research program

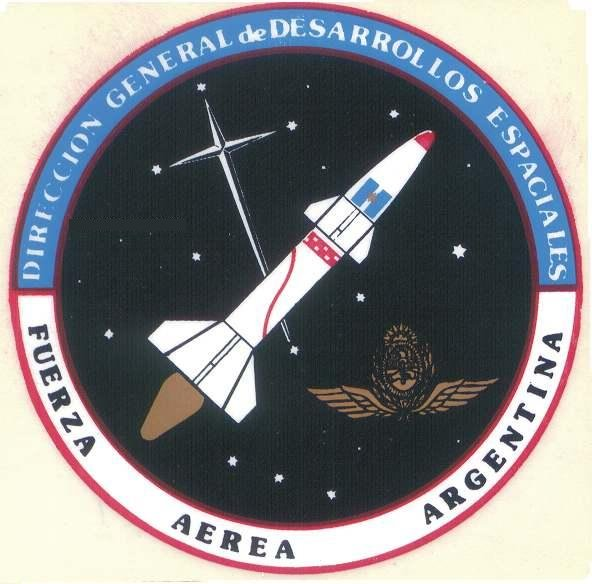
Emblem of the Dirección General de Desarrollos Espaciales (Directorate General of Space Developments), the Argentine Air Force group in charge of the project

The Argentine Condor missile was a multinational space research program started in the 1970s. It involved significant contract work being performed by German company MBB (now a group within Daimler AG), but later developed into a ballistic missiles program.

== Condor I ==
The original Condor had little military capability but helped build expertise that was later used for the Alacrán missile program. The Alacrán program developed a functional short-range ballistic missile.

=== Specifications (Condor I) ===
- Length: 8 metres (26 ft)
- Maximum diameter: 70 centimetres (28 in)
- Stages: 1
- Fuel: HTPB
- Guidance system: inertial
- Apogee: 300 kilometres (190 mi)
- Range: 100 kilometres (62 mi)
- Payload: 500 kilograms (1,100 lb)

== Alacrán (Condor IAIII) ==
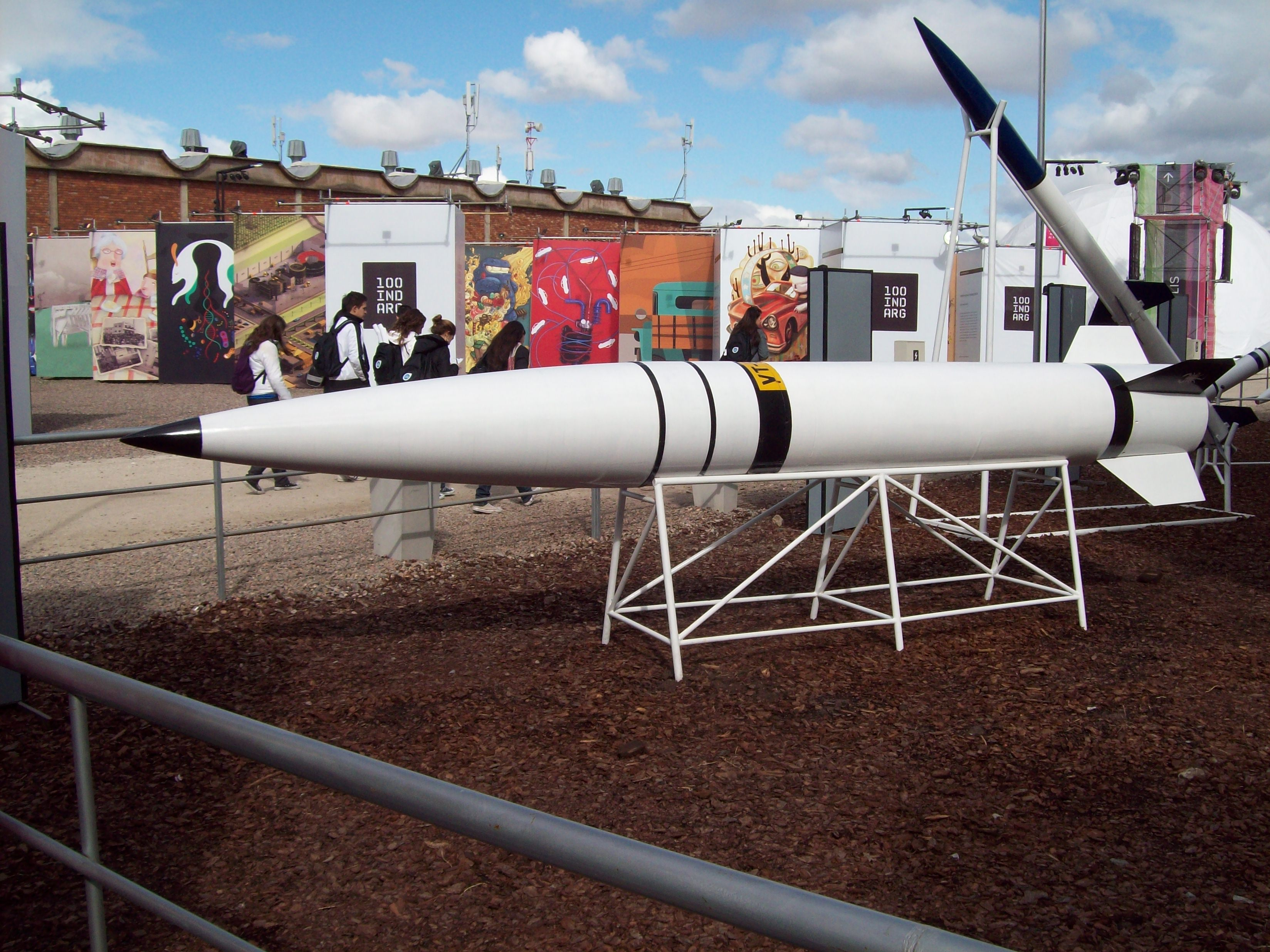
Alacrán Missile, derived from the earlier Condor IAIII

The Alacrán missile was a short range ballistic missile derived from the Condor Missile Program.

Derived from the Condor IAIII prototype, the Alacrán missile had shorter stabilization fins, an inertial guidance system, and a 1000CAP1 cluster warhead.

=== Specifications (Condor IAIII - Alacrán) ===
- Length: 8 metres (26 ft)
- Maximum diameter: 70 centimetres (28 in)
- Stages: 1
- Fuel: HTPB
- Guidance system: inertial
- Apogee: 100 kilometres (62 mi)
- Range: 115 kilometres (71 mi)
- Warhead: 1000CAM1 cluster munition warhead, 500 kilograms (1,100 lb)

== Condor II ==
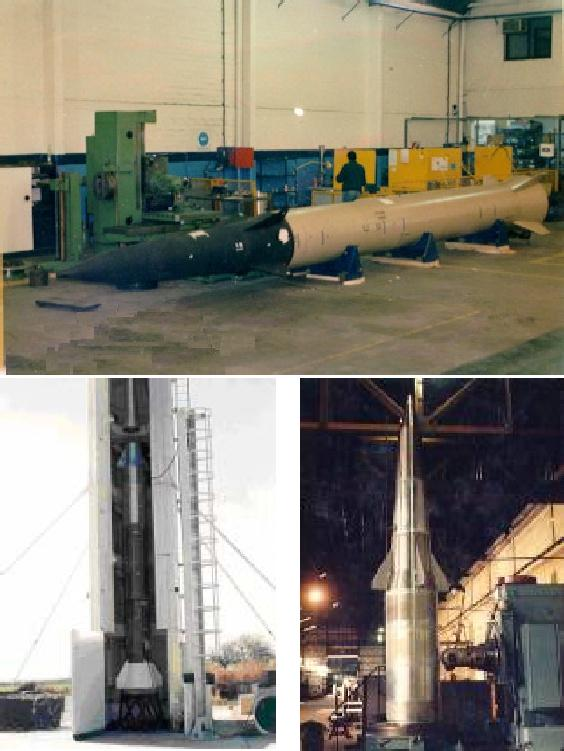
Condor II prototypes in several stages of completion. Location: El Chamical Air Force testing grounds.

During and after the 1982 Falklands War (Spanish: Guerra de las Malvinas), France (which initially supplied the missiles) placed an arms embargo on Argentina, causing the Argentine Air Force, under the command of Ernesto Crespo, to develop its own medium-range missile in the Condor II program.

This program was undertaken in close collaboration with Egypt, and then Ba'athist Iraq (the Iraqi version of the missile was called BADR-2000). However, it was discontinued in the early 1990s by President Carlos Menem because of political pressure from the United States. The missile was developed in Falda del Carmen, Córdoba Province.

The Condor missile had a range of 800 km to 1,000 km and a 1000CAP1 500 kg cluster munition warhead.

In 1997, the Argentine Air Force reported to the US Congress that it still possessed two of the missiles that were to be destroyed.

== Condor III ==
There have been reports of a Condor III program. The Condor III would have an increased range to some 1,500 km (930 mi) with the same payload as the Condor II.

== See also ==
- Argentina and weapons of mass destruction
