= Contadora support group =

Grupo de apoyo a Contadora Grupo de Apoio à Contadora Contadora support group
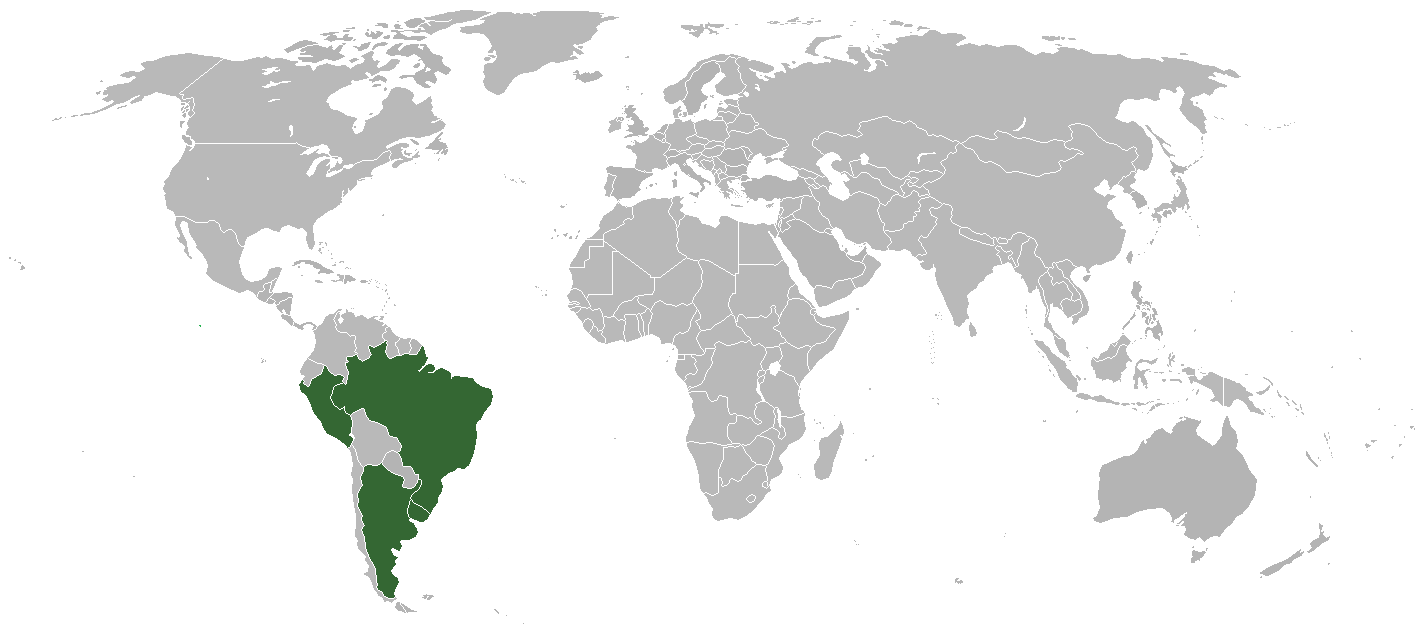
- Member countries of the Contadora support group
- Official languages: Spanish, Portuguese
- Type: Political
- Membership: 4 members: Argentina; Brazil; Peru; Uruguay

Establishment
  - Presidential inauguration of Alan García: July 29, 1985

The Contadora support group (Spanish: Grupo de apoyo a Contadora, Portuguese: Grupo de Apoio à Contadora) was a group composed by Argentina, Brazil, Peru and Uruguay. It provided support for the Contadora group from South America, in the conflict between Nicaragua and the United States.

== History ==
The conflict between the United States and the Sandinista government in Nicaragua attracted the attention of fellow Latin American countries Colombia, Mexico, Panama and Venezuela, who started the Contadora group to request a peaceful solution.

The Argentine president Raúl Alfonsín met the Peruvian president Alan García in Peru, during his presidential inauguration in 1985. Both of them agreed to make coordinated diplomatic actions in relation to the conflict. According to the Argentine chancellor Dante Caputo, the Contadora group was growing inactive, and required a second group to support it. Chancellors Dante Caputo, Olavo Setúbal from Brazil and Enrique Iglesias from Uruguay met in Punta del Este and had a similar agreement. The creation of a group with the four countries was announced in Lima, on July 29, 1985. The Contadora group and the Contadora support group met in Cartagena, Colombia, on August 24 and 25, 1985. Both groups were collectively known as "the group of eight".

The group of eight had a second meeting in Caraballeda, Venezuela, in 1986, and issued the "Caraballeda message". Other Central American countries accepted it. However, the proposals ultimately failed because of the reluctance of both Nicaragua and the United States to change their positions. Later meetings attempted to increase the scope of the group. They discussed about fostering the bilateral relations, creating a Latin American parliament, and a technological club. They also created a "debitors club", to make coordinated actions towards creditors of their foreign debt. According to a proposal by Caputo, they rejected the United Kingdom policy towards the Falkland Islands sovereignty dispute. Both groups were eventually replaced by the Rio Group.

== Bibliography ==
- Aravena, Francisco Rojas (2012). América Latina y el Caribe: Relaciones Internacionales en el siglo XXI. Argentina: Teseo. ISBN 978-9-87186-748-6.
- Muiño, Oscar (2015). Alfonsín: mitos y verdades del padre de la democracia. Argentina: Aguilar. ISBN 9789870431947.
