= Argentina and weapons of mass destruction =

Nuclear weapons program (1980s to 1983)

Argentine Republic
- Nuclear program start date: Early 1980s (ended in 1983)
- First nuclear weapon test: None
- First thermonuclear weapon test: None
- Last nuclear test: None
- Largest yield test: None
- Total tests: None
- Peak stockpile: None
- Current stockpile: None
- Deployed warheads: None
- Total deployed warhead megatonnage: None
- Maximum missile range: None
- NPT party: Yes

Under a military dictatorship, Argentina began a nuclear weapons program in the early 1980s, but this was abolished in 1983 after the return to civilian government.

== Missile systems ==
During the 1980s, the Alacrán (English: Scorpion) and Cóndor 1 (English: Condor) missiles were developed. The Cóndor 2, with a range of around 1,000 kilometres, was intended to be developed with assistance from Egypt and Ba'athist Iraq. However, the project was condemned by the United States and the Missile Technology Control Regime. It was reportedly scrapped during the Menem administration under pressure from the United States government and due to a lack of funds in 1990.

== Biological and chemical weapons ==
Argentina acceded to the Geneva Protocol on May 12, 1969 and has been active in non-proliferation efforts, ratifying the Biological Weapons Convention in 1979 and the Chemical Weapons Convention on October 2, 1995.

In September 1991, Argentina, together with Brazil and Chile, signed the Mendoza Declaration, which commits signatories not to use, develop, produce, acquire, stock, or transfer—directly or indirectly—chemical or biological weapons.

== Nuclear weapons ==
Argentina conducted a nuclear weapon research program during the National Reorganization Process regime, in part because of a similar Brazilian program assisted by West Germany. International concern over the possibility of an Argentine nuclear weapons program magnified after the Falklands War in 1982, when the U.S. intelligence community estimated that Argentina could build a nuclear bomb from its civilian nuclear program. Government officials confirmed in November 1983 that research carried out at the Balseiro Institute's research reactor had yielded the capacity for weapons-grade uranium enrichment. The program was abandoned, however, shortly after the return of democracy on December 10, 1983. President Raúl Alfonsín placed the nuclear program back under civilian control. The program was also abandoned because Argentina did not have bad relations with Brazil, and because Brazil was wealthier than Argentina and thus more advantaged in an arms race.

After the Brazilian transition to democracy, Argentina and Brazil began cooperating on nuclear non-proliferation. In 1991, the National Congresses of Argentina and Brazil ratified a bilateral inspection agreement that created the Brazilian-Argentine Agency for Accounting and Control of Nuclear Materials (ABACC) to verify both countries' pledges to use nuclear energy only for peaceful purposes. On February 10, 1995, Argentina acceded to the Non-Proliferation Treaty as a non-nuclear weapon state. Argentina continues to use nuclear power in non-military roles, and is noted as an exporter of civilian use nuclear technology.

In 2010, the government announced that it would start working in the creation of a nuclear submarine. This type of submarine uses nuclear power for propulsion. The announcement was highly criticized by politicians from opposing parties.

In accord with three presidential decrees of 1960, 1962 and 1963, Argentina supplied about 90 tons of unsafeguarded yellowcake (uranium oxide) to Israel to fuel the Dimona reactor, reportedly creating the fissile material for Israel's first nuclear weapons.

== See also ==
- Brazilian-Argentine Agency for Accounting and Control of Nuclear Materials
- Brazilian nuclear weapons program
- Huemul Project
- Tlatelolco Treaty – 1967 nuclear weapons treaty

== Sources ==
- "The Nuclear Club: Membership has its kilotons". CBC News Online. April 12, 2006. Archived from the original on 14 April 2006.
- Nuclear Threat Initiative. "Argentina". Archived from the original on 19 April 2006.
