= Brazilian–Argentine Agency for Accounting and Control of Nuclear Materials =

Brazilian-Argentine Agency for Accounting and Control of Nuclear Materials
- Agência Brasileiro-Argentina de Contabilidade e Controle de Materiais Nucleares (in Portuguese); Agencia Brasileño-Argentina de Contabilidad y Control de Materiales Nucleares (in Spanish)

Agency overview
- Formed: July 18, 1991
- Jurisdiction: Argentina; Brazil
- Headquarters: Rio de Janeiro; Buenos Aires
- Employees: Undisclosed
- Annual budget: Undisclosed
- Website: www.abacc.org.br

Footnotes
- Source: Brazilian-Argentine Agency for Accounting and Control of Nuclear Materials

The Brazilian–Argentine Agency for Accounting and Control of Nuclear Materials (ABACC; Portuguese: Agência Brasileiro-Argentina de Contabilidade e Controle de Materiais Nucleares; Spanish: Agencia Brasileño-Argentina de Contabilidad y Control de Materiales Nucleares) is a binational safeguards agency playing an active role in the verification of the peaceful use of nuclear materials that could be used, either directly or indirectly, for the manufacture of weapons of mass destruction.

Nuclear cooperation between Argentina and Brazil traces back to 1986 with the signature of a protocol about immediate sharing of information and mutual assistance in case of nuclear accidents and radiological emergencies The warm personal relationship that existed between Argentina's democratically elected president Raúl Alfonsín and his Brazilian counterpart, João Figueiredo, further catalyzed the deepening of relations which is now understood to have begun under their authoritarian predecessors.

The ABACC was created on July 18, 1991 and is the only binational safeguards organization existing in the world and the first binational organization created by Argentina and Brazil.

As a regional agency dealing with safeguards, its main goal is guaranteeing Argentina, Brazil and the international community that all the nuclear materials are used exclusively for peaceful purposes.

The ABACC led both countries bringing into force the Treaty of Tlatelolco in 1994, which established a nuclear-weapons-free-zone in Latin America and the Caribbean. Later, they joined the Non-Proliferation Treaty (NPT): Argentina in 1995 and Brazil in 1998.

== See also ==
- Argentine Atomic Energy Commission (CNEA)
- Brazilian Nuclear Energy Commission (CNEN)
- Brazil and weapons of mass destruction
- Argentina and weapons of mass destruction
- Argentina–Brazil relations
- Institute of Nuclear Materials Management
