= Resende Nuclear Fuel Factory =

The Nuclear Fuel Factory (FCN) is located near Resende, state of Rio de Janeiro, comprising three units, and has a production capacity of 280 tons of uranium per year. At present, FCN was modernized and produces at the Components and Assembly Unit the fuel rods and fuel elements needed for Brazilian nuclear reactors. The Reconversion and Pellets Production Unit is operating since 1999 with a capacity of 160 tons of UO_{2} pellets/year. The UO_{2} reconversion line uses the AUC process. The Nuclear Fuel Factory also produces other fuel element components, such as top and bottom nozzles, spacer grids and end plugs for export demands. Previously, Brazil supplied the uranium, which is transported to Canada where it's converted into hexafluoride gas (UF_{6}), and then to the United Kingdom for enrichment before it returns to Brazil for fabrication into fuel elements.

The unit has an in-house nuclear safety program and an external one, for environmental monitoring. A nuclear accounting system, internally implemented, required by the Brazilian Nuclear Energy Commission (CNEN) and supervised by the International Atomic Energy Agency (IAEA) continuously performs a balance of the material in processing with a precision reaching tenths of milligrams.

In 2018 a seventh cascade of centrifuges was inaugurated, increasing enrichment capacity by 25%. This gives the plant the capacity to produce about 50% of the annual fuel requirements of Angra Nuclear Power Plant unit 1. The new cascade is the first part of a ten cascade expansion plan.

== IAEA Inspections ==
By late 2003 the International Atomic Energy Agency (IAEA) was negotiating with the Brazilian Government to ensure that the new uranium enrichment facility, due to begin operating in 2005, was properly safeguarded.

In April 2004 the Brazilian Government denied access for the IAEA inspectors to the uranium enrichment facility being built in Resende. The plant, scheduled to begin operation in October 2004, remains subject to IAEA inspections aimed at making sure it is not used for producing weapons-grade material. In February and March 2004 Brazil refused to let IAEA inspectors see equipment in the plant, citing a need to protect proprietary information. The IAEA had dispatched inspectors to Resende who found significant portions of the facility and its contents shielded from view. Walls had been built and coverings are draped over equipment.

By November 2004 the IAEA was able to reach an agreement in principle with the Brazilian government on a safeguards approach to verify the enrichment facilities in Brazil, at the Resende facility. This approach would enable the IAEA to do credible inspections but at the same time take care of Brazil's need to protect certain commercial sensitivity inside the facility.
