= Confidence-building measures in Central America =

Confidence-building measures (CBMs) were a key element in the Central American peace process. Although CBMs have always existed in some form or another in the hemisphere's conflict situations, the Central American peace process for the first time in a Latin American conflict explicitly used CBM terminology and techniques. This was no accident, and reflected the key role played by the UN and by certain outside actors (the Canadians, the International Peace Academy) in bringing these ideas to the peace process.

== The role of CBMs ==
The significance of peacekeeping and CBMs in the Central American peace process was a double one: not only did these two approaches contribute to the solution of the conflict, they also served as examples of the value of these two approaches to other Latin American conflict situations, and were indications of how the hemisphere's military institutions might use these notions as new roles in the changing environment of the post-Cold War. Further, one Latin nation (Venezuela) provided ONUCA (UN Observer Group in Central America) with a battalion of infantry at the key moment of Contra demobilization in mid-1990; Argentina provided patrol boats to monitor the Gulf of Fonseca (where El Salvador, Honduras and Nicaragua abut). Several other American nations (Brazil, Canada, Ecuador, Colombia, Venezuela, Mexico) provided military observers and other support for ONUCA and ONUSAL (UN Observer Group in El Salvador).

== The 1983 Contadora meeting ==
The presence and importance of CBMs in the Central American peace process can be tracked from its beginning at the Contadora meeting through to the present. The historic first Contadora meeting of the Foreign Ministers of Mexico, Panama, Colombia, and Venezuela, held on the Panamanian island of that name on 8–9 January 1983, dealt with general statements of concern and principles which would lead to a peaceful resolution of Central America's several conflicts. The "Contadora Declaration" itself made an urgent appeal to the countries of Central America to engage in dialogue and negotiation so as to reduce tension and lay the foundations for a permanent atmosphere of peaceful coexistence and mutual respect among states. Because of the very general nature of the meeting, the issue of peace verification using outside observers was not discussed at Contadora. The CBMs at the first Contadora meeting must be seen as being not at the specific and military level, but rather at the more abstract and broad level of calling for greater trust, contacts and involvement among the various parties to the dispute.

== The July 1983 Cancún Declaration ==
Six months later, meeting at the Mexican resort of Cancún, the Presidents of the four Contadora nations met to expand on the work of their Foreign Ministers. The 17 July 1983 Cancún Declaration was more specific, and included several recommendations which explicitly incorporated CBMs as well as several other approaches to conflict resolution (international third-party peacekeeping and verification). Security was a major concern of the Cancún Declaration, which focused on effectively controlling the arms race, on ending arms trafficking, on eliminating foreign military advisors, on creating demilitarized zones, on prohibiting the use of one state's territory to destabilize another's, and on prohibiting other forms of interference in the internal affairs of countries in the region. The issue of verification was also given greater specificity in that the Declaration mentioned the need to establish "appropriate supervisory machinery" in order to verify the security commitments.

Confidence-building measures also appear in the Cancún Declaration in the form of recommendations for joint boundary commissions and direct communications between governments, as well as the need to give prior notice of troop movements near frontiers when the contingents exceeded certain limits. The use of the phrase "commitment to promote a climate of détente and confidence" also reflects an increasingly specific appreciation of the utility of confidence-building measures.

== Panama meeting of September 1983 ==
The Panama Foreign Ministers Meeting of 7–9 September 1983 produced the "21 Objectives" Document which should be viewed as the foundation on which the subsequent draft treaties were built. The security objectives were the most controversial and were fairly specific. The problem of effective verification remained unsolved by the 21 Objectives document, and consideration of CBMs was more implicit than explicit.

== Contadora Acts of 1984–86 ==
The years 1984 through 1986 saw the drafting of several "Contadora Acts", none of which succeeded in breaching the gap between the Nicaraguan position and that of the other Central American nations (especially those close to the US position). However, all of these drafts include CBMs, and increasingly show the impact of the advice and suggestions being provided by the Canadians and other actors. Many of these provisions dealt with verification and were also linked to the need for impartial third-party neutral treaty verifiers. The Canadians, reflecting their long experience with UN peacekeeping, strongly recommended that this issue be left in the hands of the United Nations, which could provide a credible political mandate as well as a coherent logistical structure. The various Contadora drafts in these years tended to be incremental, and included all (or most) of the verification and confidence-building provisions mentioned in the earlier declarations, draft treaties, and supplementary implementation documents. The CBMs involved communications links ("hot lines"), provisions for notification of troop movements, ceilings on certain types of weapons and troop units, exchange of information, arms and troop registries, and observation posts and joint patrolling along sensitive borders.

== Esquipulas Peace plan of 1987 in Nicaragua ==
Most of these CBMs and verification provisions were picked up by the drafters of the so-called "Arias (or Esquipulas) Peace Plan" in 1987 when the weakening Contadora process gave way to the Central American's own Esquipulas peace plan. The process of demobilizing the Contras inside Nicaragua under the Esquipulas peace plan involved frequent applications of a variety of CBMs. In early and mid-1990 the United Nations peacekeeping presence, ONUCA (with significant military contributions from Canada and Spain, and its battalion of Venezuelan paratroop infantry), employed a number of CBMs in its attempts to persuade the Contras to disarm, and to keep communications open between the Contras, the Sandinistas, and the incoming Violeta Chamorro administration.

As the Contra demobilization process wound down in mid-1990 and the Chamorro government settled in, the Esquipulas Security Commission continued its work of attempting to establish an inventory of troops and arms, and encourage a broad range of multilateral CBMs. In parallel with the disarmament work of the Security Commission some progress was being made in developing bilateral confidence-building measures.

== Early 1990s ==
The significance of CBMs in Central America in the early 1990s was highlighted at the July 1991 San Salvador presidential summit, when the Hondurans floated their comprehensive disarmament and confidence-building proposal (a "Central American Security Treaty") which would set ceilings on military inventories and troops. The Honduran proposal had a heavy emphasis on confidence-building measures as a way of diminishing the possibility of inter-state conflicts. These confidence-building measures would include a pledge by the Central American nations to forsake the use of force to settle disputes, and a commitment from the U.S. not to support irregular movements (i.e., the Contras) in Central America. The proposal also included suggestions of new tasks for the armed forces, such as involvement in the control of drugs and protection of natural resources. Some of the Honduran ideas found an echo in the speeches made at the Ibero-American Summit which followed immediately afterwards, including Peruvian President Fujimori's proposal for a disarmed Latin America.

By 1992 the notion of confidence-building measures was firmly imbedded in Central American thinking about disarmament and lowering of tensions. A number of such measures were included in the Honduran security proposal, and the Esquipulas Security Commission mentioned several others in its various reports to the Central American presidents. For example, in June 1991 plans were announced for the establishment of a formal "hot line" which would provide secure and immediate telephone links between the presidents of the five Central American nations plus Panama. Thus, one of the features of the long Contadora/Esquipulas process was the way in which it greatly increased communication between the Central American countries, and especially its presidents, foreign ministers, and senior military officials. This confidence-building measure, along with many others, was an important legacy of the peace process of the 1980s.

In June 1991 the OAS General Assembly, meeting in Santiago, Chile, authorized the creation of a "Working Group on Cooperation for Hemisphere Security". In February 1992 a draft Committee document revealed the non-traditional nature of its focus as it defined a "Broad Security Concept" which would include such items as: cooperation for security; confidence-building mechanisms to strengthen security; democratic stability; human rights; economic security; protection of the environment; critical poverty; non-proliferation and control of unconventional weapons; transparency in arms transfers; non-intervention; and cooperation in the struggle against drugs. The specific references to "confidence-building mechanisms" and "transparency in arms transfers" are clear indications of the significance of CBMs in contemporary Latin American thinking on security issues.
