= National Nuclear Energy Commission =

Nuclear program agency of Brazil

National Nuclear Energy Commission Comissão Nacional de Energia Nuclear
- Abbreviation: CNEN
- Formation: 10 October 1956
- Purpose: Nuclear research, development, control, supervision and safety
- Headquarters: Rio de Janeiro, Brazil
- President: Paulo Roberto Pertusi
- Parent organization: Ministry of Science and Technology
- Website: www.cnen.gov.br

The National Nuclear Energy Commission (Portuguese: Comissão Nacional de Energia Nuclear; CNEN) is the Brazilian government agency responsible for orientation, planning, supervision, and control of the Brazil's nuclear program. The agency was created on 10 October 1956. The CNEN is under the direct control of the Ministry of Science and Technology.

== Organization ==
The agency is headquartered in Rio de Janeiro and manages several institutes and facilities throughout Brazil. It has five regional districts, with headquarters in Angra dos Reis, Caetité, Fortaleza, Porto Alegre, and Resende, and a special office in Brasília.

=== Nuclear Energy Research Institute ===
The Nuclear Energy Research Institute (Portuguese: Instituto de Pesquisas Energéticas e Nucleares; IPEN) is an agency managed by CNEN and associated to the São Paulo State government and the University of São Paulo. The IPEN has a broad infrastructure of laboratories, a research reactor (IEA-R1), an industrial particle accelerator, and a compact cyclotron of variable energy. The IPEN is involved primarily in conducting research in the areas of nuclear materials and processes, nuclear reactors, applications of nuclear techniques, and nuclear safety. The IPEN is noted for its production of radioisotopes for nuclear medicine.

=== Radiological Protection and Dosimetry Institute ===
The Radiological Protection and Dosimetry Institute (Portuguese: Instituto de Radioproteção e Dosimetria; IRD) is an institute of CNEN responsible for radiological protection and dosimetry of ionizing radiation, and conducts inspection of radioactive use in the industry, power plants and other areas. Since 1976, the IRD possesses a Secondary Standard Dosimetry Laboratory, recognized by the International Atomic Energy Agency and the World Health Organization.

=== Nuclear Technology Development Center ===
The Nuclear Technology Development Center (Portuguese: Centro de Desenvolvimento da Tecnologia Nuclear; CDTN) is a nuclear research institute of CNEN. It originated in the Engineering School of the Federal University of Minas Gerais, and was created in 1952 with the name of Institute of Radioactive Researches (IPR). It was the first institution in Brazil devoted entirely to the nuclear area. Its initial activities included the research of radioactive mineral occurrences, studies in nuclear physics field, metallurgy and in materials of nuclear interest. In 1960 the research Reactor TRIGA Mark 1 was inaugurated at the Institute, with the purpose of training, research and radioisotope production.

=== Nuclear Engineering Institute ===
The Nuclear Engineering Institute (Portuguese: Instituto de Engenharia Nuclear; IEN) is a research unit of CNEN. Since 1962, IEN has been contributing to the national mastering of technologies in the nuclear field and its correlates. Its scope is generating and transferring knowledge and technology to the productive sector - public and private - with society as its final beneficiary.

Patents publications, technology licensing, radiopharmaceuticals, materials essays and analysis, radioactive waste collecting, consulting and human resources formation are IEN's main products and services.

=== Central-West Regional Center of Nuclear Science ===
The Central-West Regional Center of Nuclear Science (Portuguese: Centro Regional de Ciências Nucleares do Centro-Oeste; CRCN-CO) is a regional institute of CNEN responsible for radioactive waste management and deposit, and nuclear technology in the Central-West Region of Brazil.

=== Northeast Regional Center of Nuclear Science ===
The Northeast Regional Center of Nuclear Science (Portuguese: Centro Regional de Ciências Nucleares do Nordeste; CRCN-NE) is a regional institute of CNEN responsible for inspection and control of facilities and radioactive materials in the Northeast Region of Brazil.

== Nuclear energy ==
Nuclear energy accounts for about 4% of the Brazil's electricity. It is produced by two pressurized water reactors at Angra Nuclear Power Plant (Angra I and II). A third reactor, Angra III, with a projected output of 1,350 MW, is planned to be finished by the 2020s. By 2025 Brazil plans to build seven more reactors. Currently, all uranium exploration, production and export in Brazil is under the control of the state through INB, which is a subsidiary of the National Nuclear Energy Commission, although the Brazilian government has recently announced that it is prepared to move ahead with private sector involvement in the nuclear fuel cycle.

== See also ==
- Brazilian-Argentine Agency for Accounting and Control of Nuclear Materials
- Brazil and weapons of mass destruction
- NUCLEP
- Brazilian science and technology
- Eletronuclear
