= List of Brazilian inventions and discoveries =

Brazilian inventions and discoveries are items, processes, techniques or discoveries which owe their existence either partially or entirely to a person born in Brazil or to a citizen of Brazil.

== Physics ==
- Pion by César Lattes, one of the discoverers

== Mathematics ==
- Costa's minimal surface by Celso José da Costa in 1982
- Introduction to the concept of spectrum in topology, by Elon Lages Lima in 1958
- Nachbin's theorem, by Leopoldo Nachbin
- Peixoto's theorem, by Maurício Peixoto in 1959

== Medicine ==
=== Diseases ===
- Bradykinin by Mauricio Rocha e Silva, Wilson Teixeira Beraldo and Gastão Rosenfeld
- Chagas disease, pathogen, vector, host, clinical manifestations and epidemiology discovery, by Carlos Chagas
- Epidemic typhus, pathogen discovery, by Henrique da Rocha Lima
- Schistosomiasis, disease cycle discovery, by Pirajá da Silva

=== Procedures, techniques or medicines ===
- Chest photofluorography by Manuel Dias de Abreu
- Jatene procedure by Adib Jatene
- Anti-ophidic serum by Vital Brazil, he is also credited as the first to develop anti-scorpion and anti-spider serums, in 1908 and 1925, respectively

== Engineering and electronics ==
- Electric shower, by Francisco Canhos Navarro.
- Orelhão by Chu Ming Silveira.
- Leme panoramic camera by Sebastião Carvalho Leme
- Airplane by Santos-Dumont (first flight without assistance).

=== Computing ===
- Lua programming language created in 1993 by Roberto Ierusalimschy, Luiz Henrique de Figueiredo, and Waldemar Celes from the Pontifical Catholic University of Rio de Janeiro: Science and Technology Center (CTC: Tecgraf).
- Elixir (programming language) created in 2012 by José Valim from a research and development project at Plataformatec.
- Pix a fast, free payment system developed by the Central Bank of Brazil

== Miscellaneous ==
- Brazilian jiu-jitsu martial art and combat sport created in the 1920s.
- Vanishing spray a substance applied to an association football pitch to provide a temporary visual marker, was created by Brazilian inventor Heine Allemagne.
- Participatory budgeting (PB) first developed in Porto Alegre, Brazil as 1986.
