= Gastão Rosenfeld =

Brazilian scientist

- Born: 26 July 1912; Budapest, Hungary
- Died: 15 July 1990 (aged 77); São Paulo, Brazil
- Known for: Discovery of bradykinin
- Scientific career
- Fields: Physics, biomedicine
- Institutions: Butantan Institute

Gastão Rosenfeld (July 26, 1912 – July 15, 1990) was a Hungarian-Brazilian physician and biomedical scientist, one of the co-discoverers of bradykinin, together with Maurício Rocha e Silva and Wilson Teixeira Beraldo, in 1949.

== Early life and education ==
Rosenfeld was born in 1912 in Budapest, Hungary, to a family of Jewish origin, and came with his parents to Brazil in 1913, graduating in medicine in 1938.

== Career ==
=== Hematology, snake venom research ===
In 1932, he began to devote himself to hematology. His work at the Butantan Institute, a research institution located in São Paulo. began in 1945, invited by Prof. William Otto Bier a famous bacteriologist (then director of the institute), and soon was charged with organizing and heading the Laboratory of Hematology and being responsible for its research line on Experimental Hematology.

In 1947 Rosenfeld started to work at São Paulo's Biological Institute, but returned to the Institute in 1951. and in 1954 took over as chief physician at the Hospital Vital Brazil, where he served until 1966. The hospital was founded by Vital Brazil, one of the world pioneers in the study of animal envenomation and was purposed as a unit of acute care for the victims of venomous animals. As such, Rosenfeld was concerned about the lack of medical knowledge about the actions of venoms on the human body and its medical therapy, at the time. Due to the fact that it was the only hospital in Brazil which was exclusively dedicated to these episodes, and, besides, since it was attached to a research and educational institution, Rosenfeld favored from the beginning the systematic observation of patients, resulting over the years in a large and original body of new knowledge about symptoms and treatment of victims of animal poisoning. This, in addition, spurred the realization of a large number of laboratory studies. Based on his experience in the field of hematology, Rosenfeld published many studies on the pathophysiology of snake bite poisoning in experimental animals, and was able to apply this rich knowledge to the clinical area.

Rosenfeld was interested in the study of biochemistry of the action of snake venom toxins in animals and humans, particularly those of the Bothrops family (lancehead or jararaca), which is extremely abundant all over Brazil and which caused a great number of accidents and deaths at his time. Among other things, he investigated the action of the venom of this snake on fibrinolysis and blood coagulation.

Among his many other contributions to biomedical sciences are the development of a rapid staining for blood smears combining May–Grunwald and Giemsa techniques in 1947 (Rosenfeld staining), the introduction a new treatment for chronic leukemia using personal control of maintenance dosis (1955) and described hementerin, an anticoagulant isolated of a Brazilian species of leech (Haementeria depressa) jointly with Eva Maria Antonia Kelen in 1975.

=== Bradykinin discovery ===
In 1948, as part of a research team at the Biological Institute, Rosenfeld co-discovered, with two other Brazilian physiologists and pharmacologists, Maurício Rocha e Silva and Wilson Teixeira Beraldo, a new endogenous peptide capable of causing a powerful fall of blood pressure on animal preparations, which they called bradykinin. The substance, a short kinin with nine amino acids only, was detected in the blood plasma of dogs after the addition of venom extracted from the Bothrops jararaca snake, brought by Rosenfeld from the Butantan Institute. The discovery was part of a continuing study on circulatory shock and proteolytic enzymes related to the toxicology of snake bites, started by Rocha e Silva as early as 1939.

Bradykinin was to prove a new autopharmacological principle, i.e., a substance that is released in the body by a metabolic modification from precursors, which are pharmacologically active. The discovery of bradykinin led to a new understanding of many physiological and pathological phenomena including circulatory shock induced by venoms and toxins. Ultimately, the extensive study of the origins of its formation in the body, by Sérgio Henrique Ferreira, a noted Brazilian pharmacologist, and others, led to the development of new anti-hypertensive agents in humans, such as captopril, developed by Squibb under the name of Capoten, and still widely used. However, the team of Brazilian scientists, including Rocha e Silva, Beraldo, Rosenfeld and Ferreira never came to enjoy the royalties of such discovery, since they always published in the public domain of pure scientific knowledge.

== Other activities ==
Rosenfeld was also an important scientific leader, having been involved in the foundation of the Brazilian Society for the Advancement of Science, in 1949.

In addition, he was an accomplished amateur photographer. A part of his photographic collection between 1962 and 1976 has been preserved at the Moreira Salles Institute.

== Bibliography ==
- Kelen EM, Rosenfeld G, Vainzof M, & Machado ZC. Experimental defibrination and bothropase: a study on the fibrinolytic mechanism in vivo. Haemostasis. 1978;7(1):35-45.
- Rosenfeld G, Hampe OG, Kelen EMA. Coagulant and fibrinolytic activity of animal venoms; determination of coagulant and fibrinolytic index of different species. Memórias do Instituto Butantan;29:143-163, 1959.
- Rosenfeld G. Symptomatology, pathology, and treatment of snake bites in South America. In: Bucherl W, Buckley EE, Deulofeu V, editors. Venomous animals and their venoms. New York: Academic Press, 1971:345-841. [ Links ]
- Rosenfeld G. Acidentes com animais peçonhentos. In Baruzzi GR, Siqueira R, Lacaz CS (eds) Geografia Médica do Brasil. São Paulo: Edusp, 1972, pp. 430–75. [ Links ]
