= XAA =

XAA may refer to:

== Science ==
- Xaa, the abbreviation for an unspecified amino acid
- Xaa-Pro aminopeptidase, an enzyme
- Xaa-Xaa-Pro tripeptidyl-peptidase, an enzyme

== Other uses ==
- ISO 639:xaa, Andalusian Arabic
- XFree86 Acceleration Architecture, an X Window System driver architecture
