= Dipeptidyl carboxypeptidase =

Dipeptidyl carboxypeptidase may refer to:

- Angiotensin-converting enzyme (ACE)
- Peptidyl-dipeptidase Dcp
