= Proline aminopeptidase =

Proline aminopeptidase may refer to:

- Prolyl aminopeptidase, an enzyme
- Xaa-Pro aminopeptidase, an enzyme
