= Vital Brazil =

Brazilian physician, biomedical scientist, philanthropist and immunologist (1865–1950)

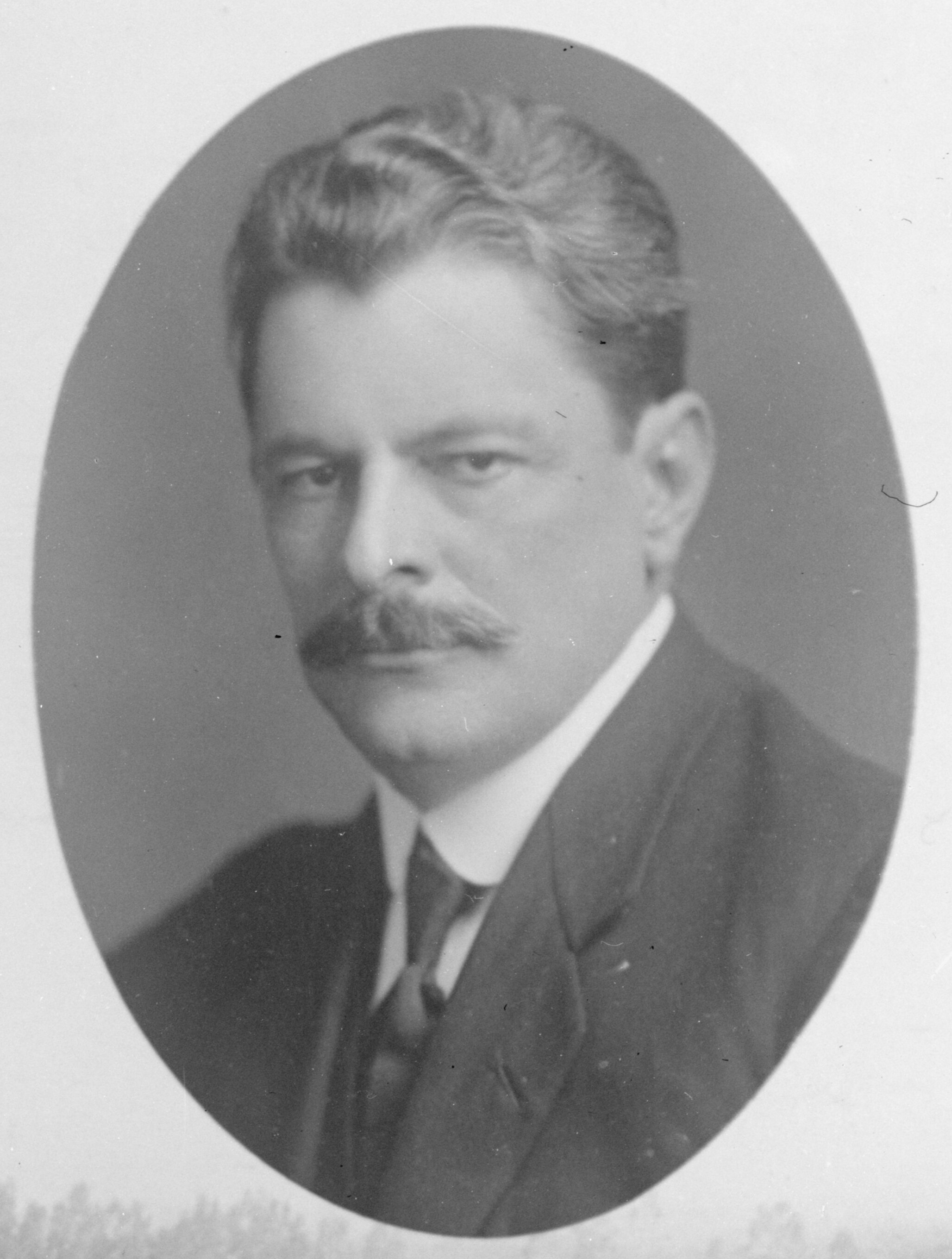
- Born: Vital Brazil Mineiro da Campanha; April 28, 1865; Campanha, Minas Gerais, Empire of Brazil
- Died: May 8, 1950 (aged 85); Rio de Janeiro, Brazil
- Scientific career
- Fields: Immunology

Vital Brazil Mineiro da Campanha (April 28, 1865 – May 8, 1950), was a Brazilian physician, biomedical scientist and immunologist, known for the discovery of the polyvalent anti-ophidic serum used to treat bites of venomous snakes of the Crotalus, Bothrops and Elaps genera. He went on to be also the first to develop anti-scorpion and anti-spider serums. He was the founder of the Butantan Institute, a research center located in São Paulo, which was the first in the world dedicated exclusively to basic and applied toxicology, the science of venomous animals.

== Life ==
Vital Brazil Mineiro da Campanha was born on April 28, 1865, in the town of Campanha, in the state of Minas Gerais, Southeastern of the Empire of Brazil. His father gave him this curious name in homage to the country, the state and the city where he was born, as well as from the date, St. Vital’s Day.

He graduated from the Rio de Janeiro School of Medicine in 1891, working as a technical assistant in the chair of Physiology in order to pay for his tuition and living expenses. After graduating, he began work in public health, initially as a sanitary inspector in São Paulo (1892–1895), where he acquired experience in the prevalent epidemic diseases of the time (smallpox, typhoid fever, yellow fever and cholera), and then as a private practitioner in the city of Botucatu, from 1895 to 1896.

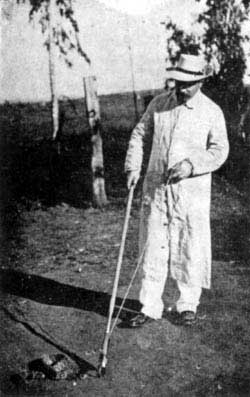
Vital Brazil in 1911.

Vital Brazil was attracted by medical research in the growing fields of bacteriology, virology and immunology at the end of the 19th century, which were being fueled by the great discoveries in Europe, by Louis Pasteur, Robert Koch, Paul Ehrlich and many others. In 1896, when he was still working in Botucatu, Vital Brazil became specially interested in snake incidents and began his studies on snake poisoning, also keeping a scientific collection of snakes stored in alcohol.

He therefore returned to São Paulo in 1897 and accepted a position in the Instituto Bacteriológico de São Paulo (Bacteriological Institute of São Paulo), under direction of the great Brazilian pathologist and epidemiologist Adolfo Lutz. There, he worked on the preparation of sera against several diseases, particularly bubonic plague, of which he fell gravely ill, fortunately surviving it.

Due to his outstanding work, the government of São Paulo founded a new Serum Therapy Institute in 1901 and gave its directorship to Vital Brazil. He also founded the Institute of Hygiene, Serum Therapy and Veterinary Medicine in the city of Niterói, in 1919, which is called today Vital Brazil Institute (Instituto Vital Brazil).

Vital Brazil carried out scientific travels to Europe in 1904 and 1914 and to 1925 to the United States. He continued working at the Butantan Institute for several decades until his retirement in 1919. He died on May 8, 1950, celebrated as one of the most important Brazilian scientists ever.

== Work ==
The new São Paulo Institute was built in a section of the city named Butantan, at the time a far-away place, near the Pinheiros river, a swampy, sparsely inhabited area. Under Vital Brazil, it soon became an energetic and exemplary research center in vaccines and sera of all kinds, which were produced locally for the prophylaxis and treatment of tetanus, diphtheria, yellow fever, smallpox and several zoonoses (diseases transmitted to humans by animals), such as the dreaded hydrophobia. The Institute came to be well known by his original name, the Butantan Institute, and is still active today.

Vital Brazil was convinced since his early work at Butantan that envenomations (poisoning by accidents with venomous animals, such as snakes, scorpions, spiders and batrachia, then the cause of thousands of deaths in Brazil) could be fought with antisera, i.e., antibodies specifically produced for venoms which were proteins or long-chain peptides. A French immunologist, Albert Calmette (1863–1933) had demonstrated this for the first time in 1892, by developing a monovalent serum to treat bites by the Indian cobra (Naja tripudians).

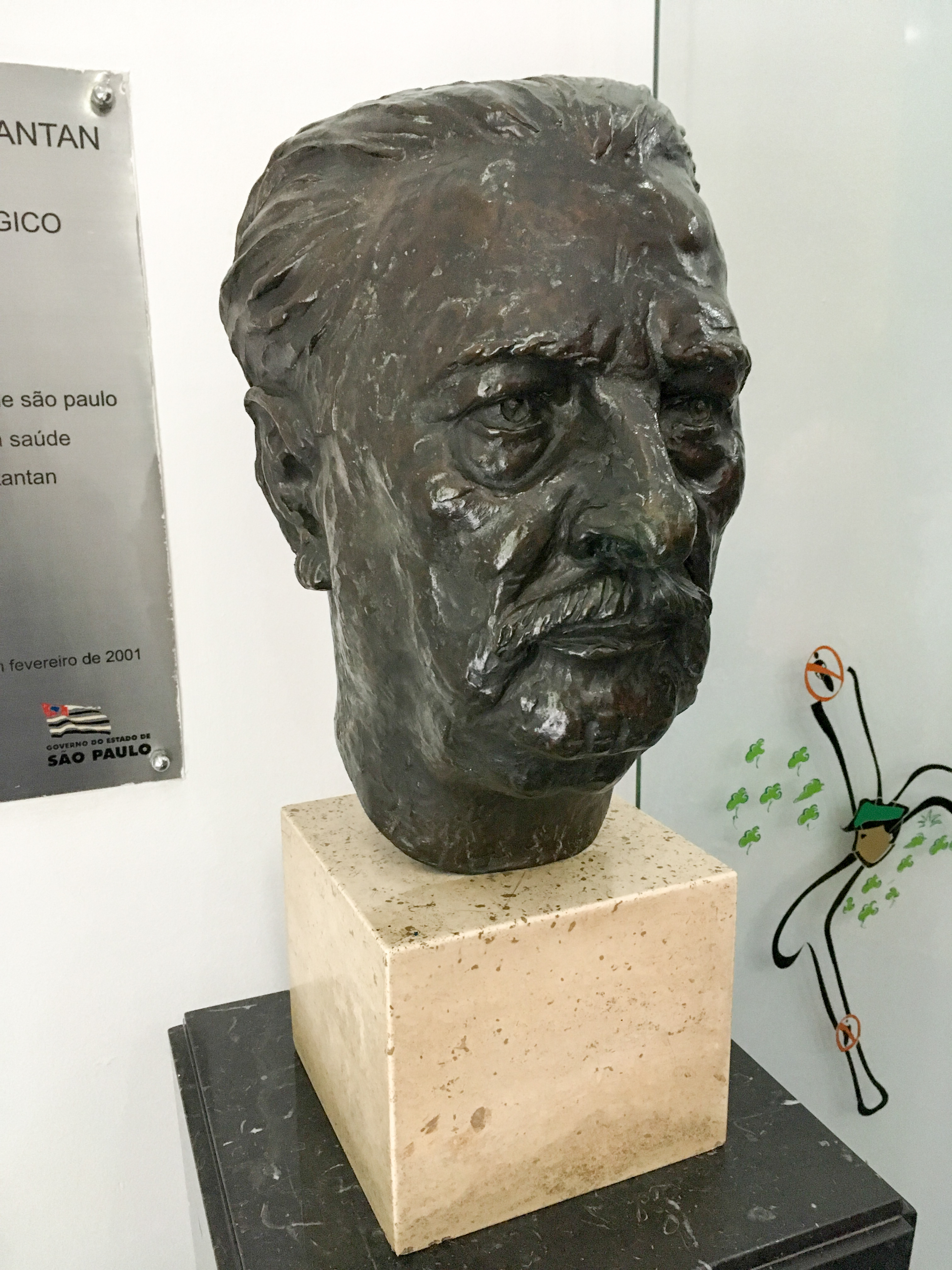
Bust of Vital Brazil in Instituto Butantan

Vital Brazil thus began a series of experimental investigations, and in 1901 he was able to prove that monovalent sera against the Asiatic species were ineffective against South American snakes, and proceeded to develop his first monovalent sera against the most common envenomations in Brazil, those produced by the Bothrops, Crotalus and Elapidae genera (represented respectively by the jararaca snake, the rattlesnake, and the coral snake). He found several clinical and biochemical similarities between bothropic and crotalic envenomations and so he was the first to achieve a polyvalent serum, i.e., simultaneously effective against both species, which represented a triumph over the stark mortality caused by these species in North, Central and South America. In a few decades, this mortality, which was higher than 25% to 20% of bitten people, fell to less than 2%.

Applying the same techniques (which involved gradual immunization of horses and sheep by administering small doses of venoms, and then extracting, purifying and freeze-drying the antibody portion from the blood of injected animals), Vital Brazil and his coworkers were able to discover the first sera against two species of scorpions' (1908) and spiders' (1925) venoms. In the USA, Vital Brazil's name made the headlines when he used his serum to save the life of a worker in the Bronx Zoo in New York City who was bitten by a rattlesnake.

Most important of all, the Butantan Institute became a fertile school for breeding a new generation of Brazilian biochemists, physiologists and pathologists, such as José Moura Gonçalves, Carlos Ribeiro Diniz, Gastão Rosenfeld, Wilson Teixeira Beraldo and Maurício Rocha e Silva, who went on to found a growing number of schools, departments and research laboratories in São Paulo, Rio de Janeiro and Minas Gerais, giving a great impetus to the development of medical and biological research and teaching in Brazil in the second half of the 20th century.

According to Bernardo Houssay, who wrote a well-cited biography of Vital Brazil in 1966, his contributions went further than herpetology:

"Vital Brazil and his collaborators have studied several actions of the venoms, (such as) coagulant, anticoagulant, hemolytic, agglutinant, cytotoxic, proteolytic, etc. (...) The (animal) poisons contain numerous enzymes which have been isolated and studied with interest in all parts since they explain many of the symptoms and constitute interesting biochemical reagents, Vital Brazil studied also the ophiophagous serpents, such as the mussurana, the ophiophagous mammals, such as the skunk-like Conepatus chilensis and others, the ophiophagous birds and certain spiders. (...) His book, La défense contre l’ophidisme published in French in 1914, attained international repercussion with three editions."

== Legacy ==
Vital Brazil is commemorated in the scientific names of four species of South American snakes:

- Rhachidelus brazili Boulenger, 1908
- Drymoluber brazili (Gomes, 1918)
- Bothrops brazili Hoge, 1954
- Chironius brazili Hamdan & Fernandes, 2015

== See also ==
- Science and Technology in Brazil
