= Streptomyces nitrosporeus =

Scientific classification
- Domain: Bacteria
- Kingdom: Bacillati
- Phylum: Actinomycetota
- Class: Actinomycetes
- Order: Streptomycetales
- Family: Streptomycetaceae
- Genus: Streptomyces
- Species: S. nitrosporeus

Binomial name
- Streptomyces nitrosporeus Okami 1952

Type strain
- ATCC 12769, ATCC 19792, BCRC 13645, CBS 544.68, CCRC 13645, CGMCC 4.1973, DSM 40023, DSM 41158, ETH 24344, ETH 24415, HUT-6032, IFO 12803, IFO 3362, IMET 43842, IMRU 3728, ISP 5023, JCM 4064, JCM 4598, KCC S-0064, KCC S-0598, KCCM 12305, KCCS-0064, KCCS-0598, KCTC 9761, NBRC 12803, NBRC 3362, NCIB 971, NCIM 2958, NCIMB 9717, NIHJ 21, NRRL B-1316, NRRL-ISP 5023, O-20, OkamiO-20, PSA 206, ptcc1138, RIA 1071, RIA 501, RIA 503, Umezawa O-20, UNIQEM 178, VKM Ac-1191, VKM Ac-1202

Species of bacterium

Streptomyces nitrosporeus is a bacterium species from the genus of Streptomyces which has been isolated from garden soil in Japan. Streptomyces nitrosporeus produces Benzastatin E, Benzastatin F, Benzastatin G Nitrosporeusine A and Nitrosporeusine B and the antibiotics nitrosporin and virantomycin and the inhibitor of angiotensin-converting enzyme foroxymithine. Streptomyces nitrosporeus can degrade cellulose.

== See also ==
- List of Streptomyces species
