= HMWK =

HMWK may refer to:

- High-molecular-weight keratin
- High-molecular-weight kininogen
- Hessian Ministry of Higher Education, Research and the Arts (German: Hessisches Ministerium für Wissenschaft und Forschung, Kunst und Kultur)

== See also ==
- Homework
