= Hementerin =

Protein in leech

Hementerin is a metalloprotease found in the saliva of a hematophagous leech, Haementeria depressa, which is responsible for the anticoagulant property of the animal's bite to prolong blood sucking from the host. It was discovered in 1955 at the Butantan Institute, in São Paulo, Brazil, by Gastão Rosenfeld and collaborators.

== Mechanism of Action ==
Hementerin is a protease, i.e., it carries out an enzymatic cleaving of a plasma protein involved in rapid blood coagulation called fibrinogen. The absence of a significant amount of plasma fibrinogen retards coagulation, thus it is a naturally occurring anticoagulant. Hementerin breaks the alpha (FGA), gamma (FGG) and beta (FGB) chains, by degrading cross-linked fibrin. It has no degrading action on amide, plasminogen and casein. In addition, hementerin inhibits platelet aggregation induced by collagen via the activation of a nitridergic pathway. Inhibition is probably achieved by enhanced nitric oxide synthase activity. Calcium is a cofactor (ligand) in this activity. The fibrinolytic activity is inhibited by EDTA, a metal chelator agent, which removes zinc from the molecule.

== Molecular Composition ==
Hementerin is an 80 kDa protein. A fragment of 30 aminoacids of its N-terminal sequence is known: XTLSEPEPTC SIEYFRYQAI EDCEYSISVK.
