= Hypotensive transfusion reaction =

Low blood pressure after blood products given

A hypotensive transfusion reaction (HTR) is a rare condition that presents with low blood pressure associated with administration of blood products. The low blood pressure quickly resolves when the transfusion is stopped.

HTRs are caused by the production of bradykinin produced through factor XII activation by negatively charged surfaces such as filters. When mechanisms for the degradation of bradykinin are impaired, the peptide builds up and causes hypotension. Angiotensin converting enzyme (ACE) is primarily responsible for its degradation (75%) but can be inhibited by administration of blood pressure medications called ACE inhibitors. Polymorphisms in ACE or aminopeptidase P (APP), another enzyme responsible for bradykinin degradation (20%) may also contribute to HTRs.
