= Deucrictibant =

Clinical data
- Other names: PHA-022121; PHA-121; PHVS 416; PHVS 719; PHVS416; PHVS719
- ATC code: None

Legal status
- Legal status: investigational

Identifiers
- IUPAC name: N-[(1S)-1-[3-chloro-5-fluoro-2-[[2-methyl-4-(2-methyl-1,2,4-triazol-3-yl)quinolin-8-yl]oxymethyl]phenyl]-1-deuterioethyl]-2-(difluoromethoxy)acetamide
- CAS Number: 2340111-58-0
- PubChem CID: 154623230
- IUPHAR/BPS: 12421
- DrugBank: DB18303
- ChemSpider: 115010415
- UNII: 69GCA2KX22
- KEGG: D12618
- ChEBI: CHEBI:758644
- ChEMBL: ChEMBL5095059

Chemical and physical data
- Formula: C_{25}H_{23}ClF_{3}N_{5}O_{3}
- Molar mass: 533.94 g·mol^{−1}
- 3D model (JSmol): Interactive image
- SMILES: [2H][C@](C)(C1=C(C(=CC(=C1)F)Cl)COC2=CC=CC3=C(C=C(N=C32)C)C4=NC=NN4C)NC(=O)COC(F)F
- InChI: InChI=InChI=1S/C25H23ClF3N5O3/c1-13-7-18(24-30-12-31-34(24)3)16-5-4-6-21(23(16)32-13)36-10-19-17(8-15(27)9-20(19)26)14(2)33-22(35)11-37-25(28)29/h4-9,12,14,25H,10-11H2,1-3H3,(H,33,35)/t14-/m0/s1/i14D; Key:ZTCLCSCHTACERP-WTDRUJNCSA-N

Deucrictibant is an investigational new drug that is being evaluated by Pharvaris for the treatment of hereditary angioedema (HAE). It is a bradykinin receptor B2 antagonist which blocks bradykinin-driven swelling attacks which is a characteristic of HAE.

Deucrictibant contains a deuterium atom to stabilize it against metabolism and to prolong the half-life of the drug.

== Clinical trials ==
Deucrictibant is in phase 3 clinical trials for hereditary angioedema.
