= Drymoluber apurimacensis =

Conservation status
- Critically Endangered (IUCN 3.1)

Scientific classification
- Kingdom: Animalia
- Phylum: Chordata
- Class: Reptilia
- Order: Squamata
- Suborder: Serpentes
- Family: Colubridae
- Genus: Drymoluber
- Species: D. apurimacensis

Binomial name
- Drymoluber apurimacensis Lehr, Carrillo, & Hocking, 2004

Species of snake

Drymoluber apurimacensis, the Apurímac woodland racer, is a species of non-venomous snake in the family Colubridae. The species is found in Peru.
