= Kininogen 1 =

Protein-coding gene in the species Homo sapiens

KNG1

Identifiers
- Aliases: KNG1, BDK, BK, KNG, Kininogen 1, HMWK, HAE6, HK
- External IDs: OMIM: 612358; MGI: 3027157; GeneCards: KNG1
Available structures
PDB	Human UniProt search: PDBe RCSB
PDB	List of PDB id codes 1NY2, 2WOK, 4ASQ, 4ASR, 4ECB, 4ECC, 5I25

Gene location (Human)
Chr.	Chromosome 3 (human)
Band	3q27.3	Start	186,717,348 bp
Band	3q27.3	End	186,744,410 bp

Gene location (Mouse)
Chr.	Chromosome 16 (mouse)
Band	16|16 B1	Start	22,804,604 bp
Band	16|16 B1	End	22,848,232 bp
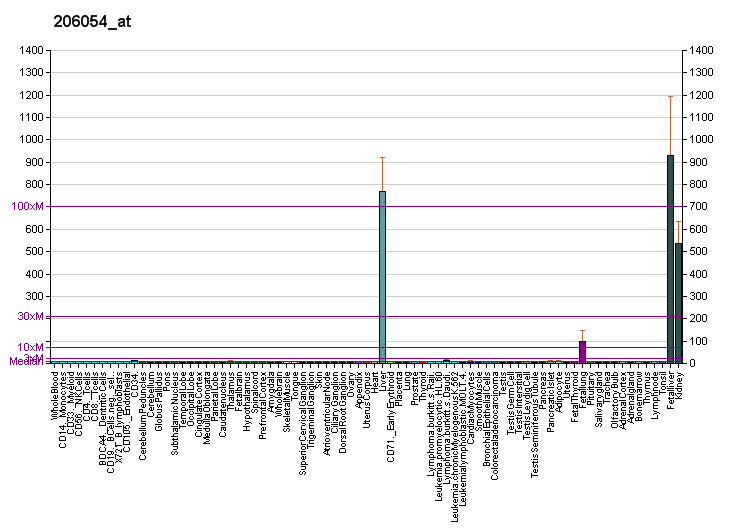

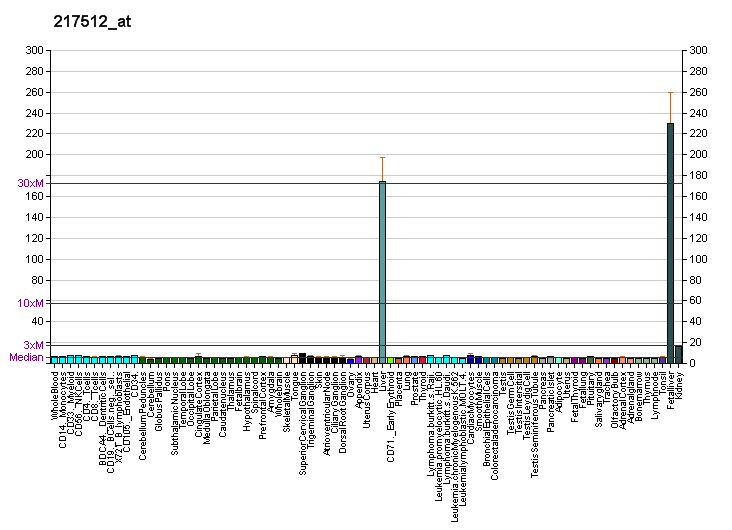
RNA expression pattern
Bgee	Human / Mouse (ortholog); Top expressed in: renal medulla; liver; right lobe of liver; kidney tubule; metanephric glomerulus; human kidney; testicle; pancreatic ductal cell; rectum; prefrontal cortex / Top expressed in: right kidney; human kidney; renal cortex; proximal tubule; liver; bone marrow; embryo; morula; placenta; esophagus; More reference expression data
BioGPS	More reference expression data
Gene ontology
Molecular function	peptidase inhibitor activity; heparin binding; zinc ion binding; protein binding; signaling receptor binding; cysteine-type endopeptidase inhibitor activity
Cellular component	blood microparticle; plasma membrane; extracellular exosome; platelet alpha granule lumen; extracellular space; endoplasmic reticulum lumen; extracellular matrix; extracellular region; collagen-containing extracellular matrix
Biological process	hemostasis; blood coagulation, intrinsic pathway; negative regulation of proteolysis; negative regulation of cell adhesion; negative regulation of peptidase activity; negative regulation of blood coagulation; positive regulation of cytosolic calcium ion concentration; platelet degranulation; vasodilation; positive regulation of apoptotic process; inflammatory response; blood coagulation; negative regulation of endopeptidase activity; post-translational protein modification; G protein-coupled receptor signaling pathway
Sources:Amigo / QuickGO
Orthologs
Databases	NCBI: entry; OMA: entry
Species	Human	Mouse
Entrez	3827	385643
Ensembl	ENSG00000113889	ENSMUSG00000060459
UniProt	P01042	n/a
RefSeq (mRNA)	NM_001166451; NM_000893; NM_001102416	NM_001102409; NM_001102410; NM_201375
RefSeq (protein)	NP_000884; NP_001095886; NP_001159923	n/a
Location (UCSC)	Chr 3: 186.72 – 186.74 Mb	Chr 16: 22.8 – 22.85 Mb
PubMed search
- Wikidata
View/Edit Human	View/Edit Mouse

Kininogen-1 (KNG1), also known as alpha-2-thiol proteinase inhibitor, Williams-Fitzgerald-Flaujeac factor or the HMWK-kallikrein factor is a protein that in humans is encoded by the KNG1 gene. Kininogen-1 is the precursor protein to high-molecular-weight kininogen (HMWK), low-molecular-weight kininogen (LMWK), and bradykinin.

== Derived proteins ==
Through alternative splicings, the gene KNG1 produces three isoforms: high-molecular-weight kininogen, low-molecular-weight kininogen, and isoform 3. Through additional cleavage, other active proteins such as bradykinin and kallidin are also produced.

=== High molecular weight kininogen ===
The canonical and longest (644 amino acid) isoform is called Kininogen-1 or high-molecular-weight (HMW) kininogen, which functions in blood coagulation by correctly positioning prekallikrein and factor XI with factor XII.

=== Low molecular weight kininogen ===
An alternative splicings produces the shorter (427 amino acid) isoform low-molecular-weight (LMW) kininogen. Unlike HMW-kininogen, this isoform does not participate in blood clotting.

=== Bradykinin/Kallidin ===
HMW-kininogen can be cleaved by the enzyme kallikrein to produce the peptide hormone Bradykinin (9 amino acids), also called Kallidin I. This hormone triggers vasodilatation, and has additional effects on various systems such as smooth muscle contraction, inflammation, and blood glucose levels. A second longer (10 amino acid) variant of this hormone can also be produced, variously called Lysyl-bradykinin, Kallidin, or Kallidin II.

== Function ==
HMWK is essential for blood coagulation and assembly of the kallikrein-kinin system. Also, bradykinin, a peptide causing numerous physiological effects, is released from HMWK. In contrast to HMWK, LMWK is not involved in blood coagulation.

Kininogen-1 is a constituent of the blood coagulation system as well as the kinin-kallikrein system.
