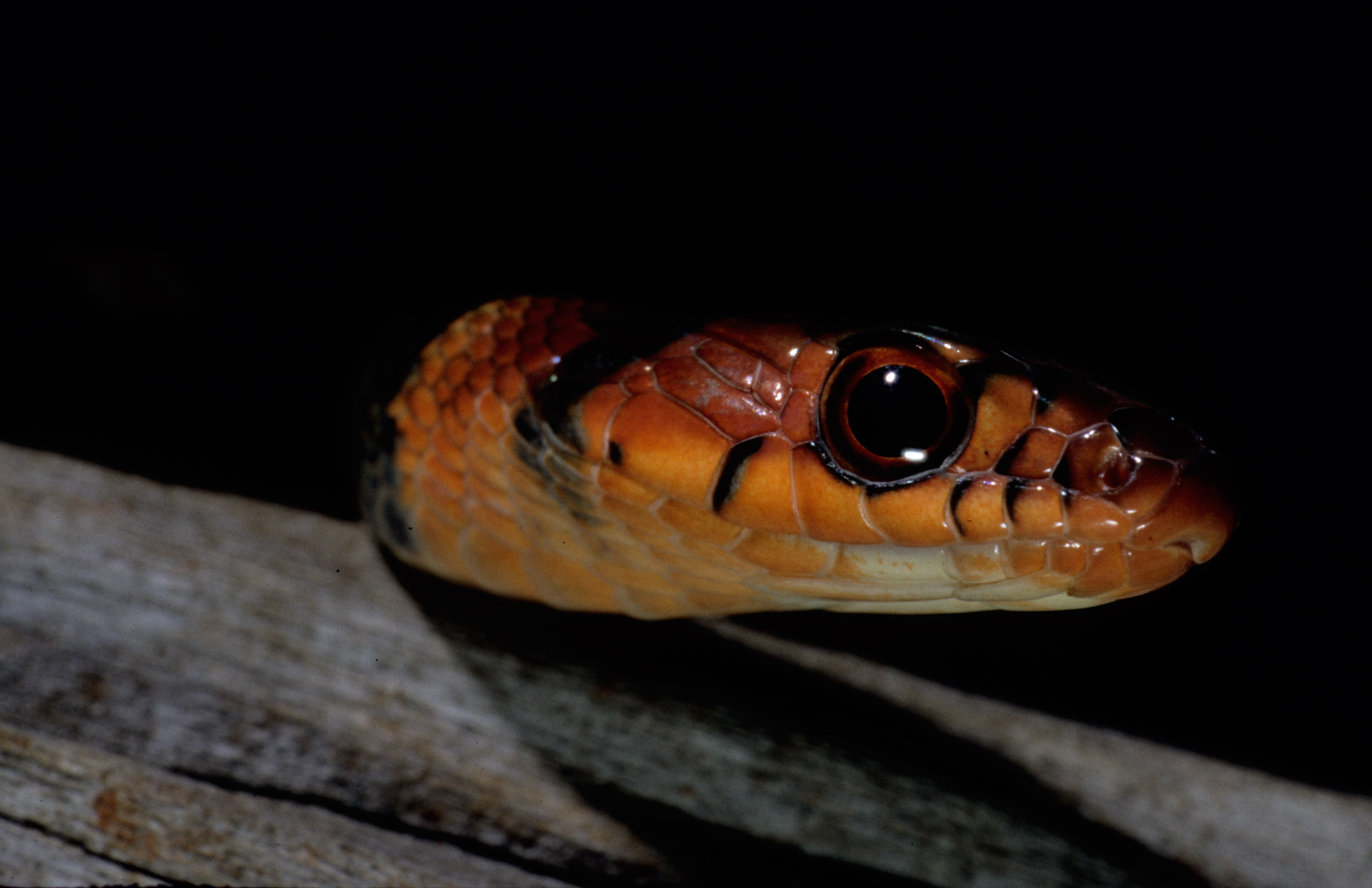
- Drymoluber brazili

Scientific classification
- Kingdom: Animalia
- Phylum: Chordata
- Class: Reptilia
- Order: Squamata
- Suborder: Serpentes
- Family: Colubridae
- Subfamily: Colubrinae
- Genus: Drymoluber; Amaral, 1930

= Drymoluber =

Genus of snakes

Drymoluber is a genus of New World snakes of the family Colubridae.

== Geographic range ==
The genus Drymoluber is endemic to South America.

== Species ==
Three species are recognized as being valid.

- Drymoluber apurimacensis Lehr, Carrillo & Hocking, 2004 - Apurímac woodland racer
- Drymoluber brazili (Gomes, 1918) - Brazilian woodland racer
- Drymoluber dichrous (W. Peters, 1863) - northern woodland racer

Nota bene: A binomial authority in parentheses indicates that the species was originally described in a genus other than Drymoluber.

== Etymology ==
The specific name, brazili, is in honor of Brazilian herpetologist Vital Brazil.
