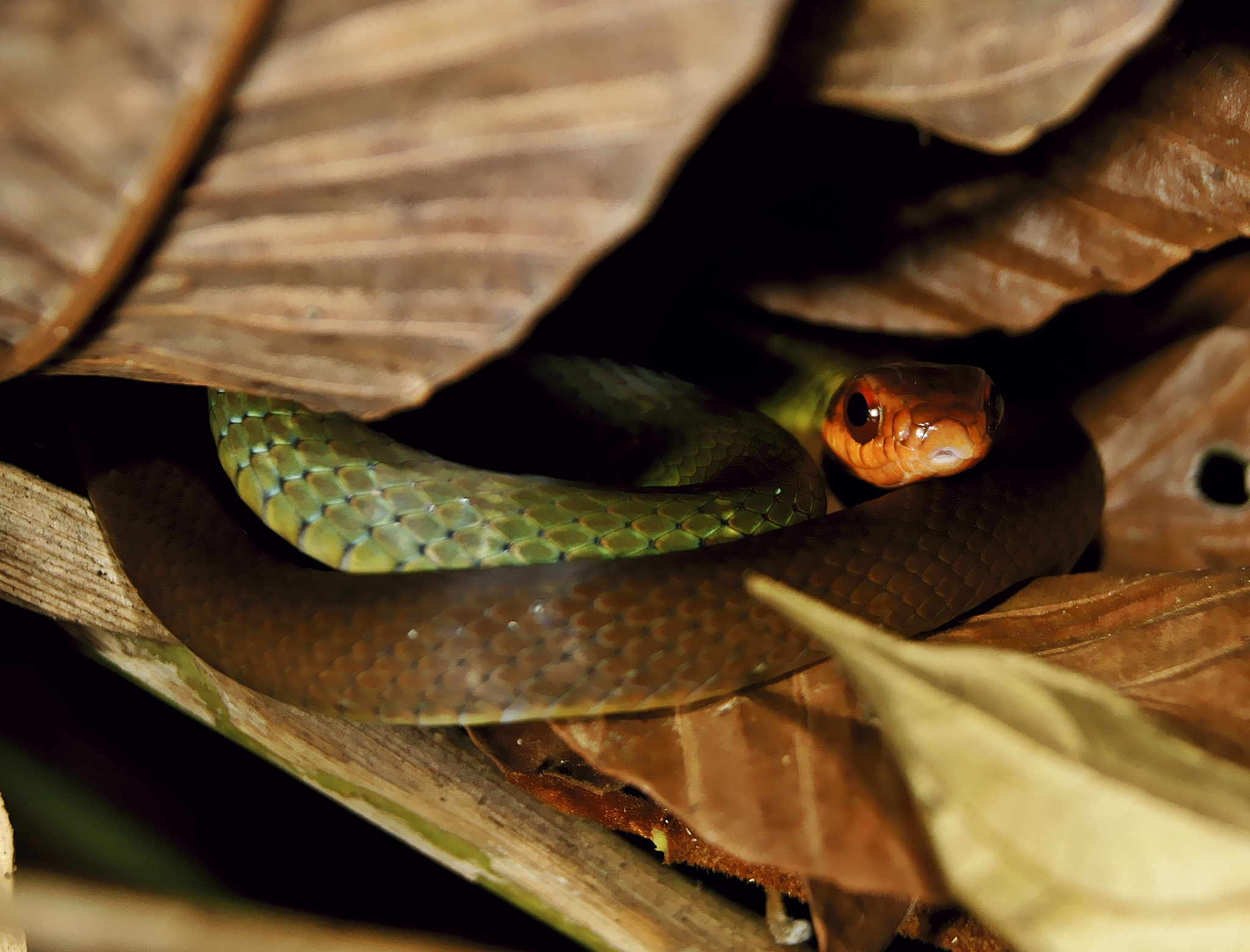

Conservation status
- Least Concern (IUCN 3.1)

Scientific classification
- Kingdom: Animalia
- Phylum: Chordata
- Class: Reptilia
- Order: Squamata
- Suborder: Serpentes
- Family: Colubridae
- Genus: Drymoluber
- Species: D. dichrous

Binomial name
- Drymoluber dichrous (W. Peters, 1863)

= Drymoluber dichrous =

Species of snake

Drymoluber dichrous, the northern woodland racer, is a species of non-venomous snake in the family Colubridae. The species is found in Colombia, Ecuador, Peru, Brazil, Venezuela, Bolivia, French Guiana, Suriname, and Guyana.
