= Federação das Sociedades de Biologia Experimental =

The Federação das Sociedades de Biologia Experimental (Federation of Experimental Biology Societies, abbreviated FeSBE) is a Brazilian scientific association which runs a number of the mainstream specialized societies in experimental biology and medicine. It was founded in 1985 and currently has the following member societies:

- Brazilian Society of Physiology (SBFis)
- Brazilian Society of Biophysics (SBBf)
- Brazilian Society of Biochemistry and Molecular Biology (SBBq)
- Brazilian Society of Pharmacology and Experimental Therapeutics (SBFTE)
- Brazilian Society of Immunology (SBI)
- Brazilian Society of Neurosciences and Behavior (SBNeC)
- Brazilian Society of Clinical Investigation (SBIC)

There are also 4 associate member societies:

- Brazilian Society of Endocrinology and Metabology (SBEM)
- Brazilian Society of Cell Biology (SBBC)
- Brazilian Society of Nuclear Biosciences (SBBN)
- Brazilian Research Association in Vision (BRAVO)

FeSBE holds an annual meeting with the societies of physiology, pharmacology, neurosciences, biophysics and clinical investigation every August, the three first societies responding for 83% of all attendees. The remaining societies biochemistry and molecular biology, immunology, endocrinology, cell biology and nuclear biosciences) have their own separate meetings.

The Annual FeSBE Meeting has the same importance of its American counterpart, the Federation of Experimental Biology Societies (FEBS), although smaller in size. In 2005 the Meeting has had 3,768 participants (74% of which were undergrad or graduate students) and 2,940 posters were presented. About 90% of the participants came from states from the South and Southeast regions.

FeSBE is affiliated with the Brazilian Society for Advancement of Science. Its current president is Dr. Gerhard Malnic. Former presidents were Eduardo Krieger, Sérgio Ferreira, Dora Fix Ventura and Antonio Carlos Campos de Carvalho.

== See also ==
- Science and technology in Brazil
