= Maurício Rocha e Silva =

- Born: 19 September 1910; Rio de Janeiro, Brazil
- Died: 19 December 1983 (aged 73); Ribeirão Preto, Brazil
- Education: University of Brazil; University College London
- Known for: Discovery of bradykinin
- Scientific career
- Fields: Physics, biomedicine, pharmacology
- Institutions: Biological Institute; Faculty of Medicine of Ribeirão Preto

Maurício Oscar da Rocha e Silva (19 September 1910 – 19 December 1983) was a Brazilian physician, biomedical scientist and pharmacologist. He discovered bradykinin, an endogenous polypeptide involved in the physiology, pharmacology and pathology of blood pressure control and many other phenomena related to the contraction of smooth muscles.

== Life ==
Rocha e Silva was the son of a psychiatrist, João Olavo da Rocha e Silva. He studied at the Faculty of Medicine of the University of Brazil (later Federal University of Rio de Janeiro), lecturing in high schools while he was a student in order to support himself. Shortly after graduation he moved in 1937 to São Paulo, and was hired by the Biological Institute, a state research institution. From 1940 to 1941, Rocha e Silva won a fellowship from the John Simon Guggenheim Memorial Foundation to go to London, England, where he studied and worked with Heinz Schild at the University College London. In 1942 he returned to the Biological Institute and continued his research line on the role of histamine in the effects of animal venoms. At the institute, he was soon appointed as the chairman of the Section of Biochemistry and Pharmacodynamics, a position he held until 1957. In that year, Rocha e Silva was invited to be the chairman of the Department of Pharmacology of the recently created Faculty of Medicine of Ribeirão Preto of the University of São Paulo, in the city of Ribeirão Preto, state of São Paulo, a position he held until his mandatory retirement in 1980. His health condition worsened shortly thereafter, and he died on 19 December 1983, at the age of 73.

Rocha e Silva was one of the greatest scientific and academic leaders of recent history in Brazil. In 1948, with a group of fellow scientists, such as José Reis, Paulo Sawaya and Gastão Rosenfeld, he founded the Sociedade Brasileira para o Progresso da Ciência (SBPC – Brazilian Society of the Advancement of Science), similar in scope and philosophy to its British and American (AAAS) counterparts. He was to become three times president of SBPC and its lifetime honorary president. Rocha e Silva was also a founding member of the Brazilian Society of Physiology, in 1957; and of the Brazilian Society of Pharmacology and Experimental Therapeutics, in 1966 (to which he served as president from 1966 to 1981). In 1967 he won the Moinho Santista Award (the highest scientific decoration at the time in Brazil) as well as the National Award of Science and Technology from the National Research Council (CNPq). He was also a vice-president of the International Union of Pharmacology.

== Work ==
Together with colleagues Wilson Teixeira Beraldo and Gastão Rosenfeld, Rocha e Silva discovered in 1948 the powerful hypotensive effects of bradykinin in animal preparations. Bradykinin was detected in the plasma of animals after the addition of venom of Bothrops jararaca (Brazilian lancehead snake), which was brought by Rosenfeld from the Butantan Institute, in São Paulo, Brazil. This discovery was part of a continuing study on circulatory shock and proteolytic enzymes related to the toxicology of snake bites, started by Rocha e Silva as early as 1939. Bradykinin was to be proved a new autopharmacological principle, i.e., a substance that is released in the body by a metabolic modification from precursors, which are pharmacologically active. According to B.J. Hagwood, Rocha e Silva's biographer, "The discovery of bradykinin has led to a new understanding of many physiological and pathological phenomena including circulatory shock induced by venoms and toxins."

The practical importance of the discovery of bradykinin became apparent when one of his collaborators at Ribeirão Preto, Sérgio Henrique Ferreira, discovered a bradykinin potentiating factor (BPF) in the bothropic venom which increases powerfully both the duration and magnitude of its effects on vasodilation and the consequent fall in blood pressure. On the basis of this finding, Squibb scientists developed the first of a new generation of highly-effective anti-hypertensive drugs, the so-called ACE inhibitors, such as captopril (trademarked Capoten), which have been saving many lives since.

Rocha e Silva had many interests besides scientific research and pharmacology. He was an accomplished amateur painter and a writer of fiction and non-fiction. He was interested in the public understanding of science, and wrote articles and books to the general public. He was also one of the founders of "Ciência e Cultura", the science magazine of the Brazilian Society for the Advancement of Science (SBPC).

== Bibliography ==
- Hagwood, BJ: Mauricio Rocha e Silva MD: snake venom, bradykinin and the rise of autopharmacology, Toxicon 1997 Nov;35(11):1569–80.
