= Silvianópolis =

- Municipality
- Location in Brazil
- Coordinates: 22°1′44″S 45°50′6″W
- Country: Brazil
- Region: Southeast
- State: Minas Gerais
- Mesoregion: Sul/Sudoeste de Minas

Population (2020)
  - Total: 6,248
- Time zone: UTC−3 (BRT)

Silvianópolis is a municipality in the state of Minas Gerais in the Southeast region of Brazil.

== Notable people ==
It was the birthplace of the physician and physiologist Wilson Teixeira Beraldo (1917–1998).

== See also ==
- List of municipalities in Minas Gerais
