= High-molecular-weight kininogen =

kininogen 1

Identifiers
- Symbol: KNG1
- Alt. symbols: KNG, BDK
- NCBI gene: 3827
- HGNC: 6383
- OMIM: 612358
- RefSeq: NM_001102416
- UniProt: P01042

Other data
- Locus: Chr. 3 q21-qter
Search for
- Structures: Swiss-model
- Domains: InterPro

High-molecular-weight kininogen (HMWK or HK) is a circulating plasma protein which participates in the initiation of blood coagulation, and in the generation of the vasodilator bradykinin via the kallikrein-kinin system. HMWK is inactive until it either adheres to binding proteins beneath an endothelium disrupted by injury, thereby initiating coagulation; or it binds to intact endothelial cells or platelets for functions other than coagulation.

== Other names ==
In the past, HMWK has been called HMWK-kallikrein factor, Flaujeac factor (1975), Fitzgerald factor (1975), and Williams-Fitzgerald-Flaujeac factor, - the eponyms being for people first reported to have HMWK deficiency. Its current accepted name is to contrast it with low-molecular-weight kininogen (LMWK) which has a similar function to HMWK in the tissue (as opposed to serum) kinin-kallikrein system.

== Gene ==
The gene for both LMWK and HMWK is located on the 3rd chromosome (3q26). Alternative splicing of the KNG1 gene transcript gives rise to processed mRNA that differs by what is included from the last two exons of the pre-mRNA. Consequently, HMWK protein differs from LMWK only in having a larger light chain: the heavy chain and bradykinin portions are identical.

== Structure ==
HMWK is an alpha-globulin with six functional domains. It circulates as a single-chain 626 amino acid polypeptide . The heavy chain contains domains 1, 2, and 3; the light chain, domains 5 and 6. Domain 4 links the heavy and light chains in addition to a disulfide bond between positions close to the N- and C-termini.

The domains contain the following functional sites:

- Domain 1 - calcium binding
- Domain 2 - cysteine protease inhibition
- Domain 3 - cysteine protease inhibition; platelet and endothelial cell binding
- Domain 4 - bradykinin generation
- Domain 5 - heparin and cell binding; antiangiogenic properties; binding to negatively charged surfaces
- Domain 6 - prekallikrein and factor XI binding (amino acids 420 to 510)(histidine rich)

== Function ==
HMWK is one of four proteins which interact to initiate the contact activation pathway (also called the intrinsic pathway) of coagulation: the other three are Factor XII, Factor XI and prekallikrein. HMWK is not enzymatically active, and functions only as a cofactor for the activation of kallikrein and factor XII. It is also necessary for the activation of factor XI by factor XIIa.

HMWK is also a precursor of bradykinin; this vasodilator is released through positive feedback by kallikrein. Cleavage by kallikein results in the liberation of two peptides, one of which is bradykinin, from HMWK's fourth domain.

Cleavage by kallikrein also helps HMWK to optimally function as a coactivator. The cleavage results in a change in the conformation of HMWK that may increase the accessibility of its surface binding domain, which could explain cleaved HMWK's increased affinity for negatively charged surfaces. The resulting severed light and heavy chains remain connected by the aforementioned disulfide bond near the original N- and C-termini.

HMWK is a strong inhibitor of cysteine proteinases. Responsible for this activity are domains 2 and 3 on its heavy chain.

Cleavage of HMWK by activated factor XI abrogates HMWK's ability to act as a cofactor, establishing negative feedback.

== Measurement ==
Measurement of HMWK is usually done with mixing studies, in which plasma deficient in HMWK is mixed with the patient's sample and a partial thromboplastin time (PTT) is determined. Results are expressed in % of normal - a value under 60% indicates a deficiency.

== Clinical significance ==
The existence of HMWK was hypothesised in 1975 when several patients were described with a deficiency of a class of plasma protein and a prolonged bleeding time and PTT. There is no increased risk of bleeding or any other symptoms, so the deficiency is a trait, not a disease.
