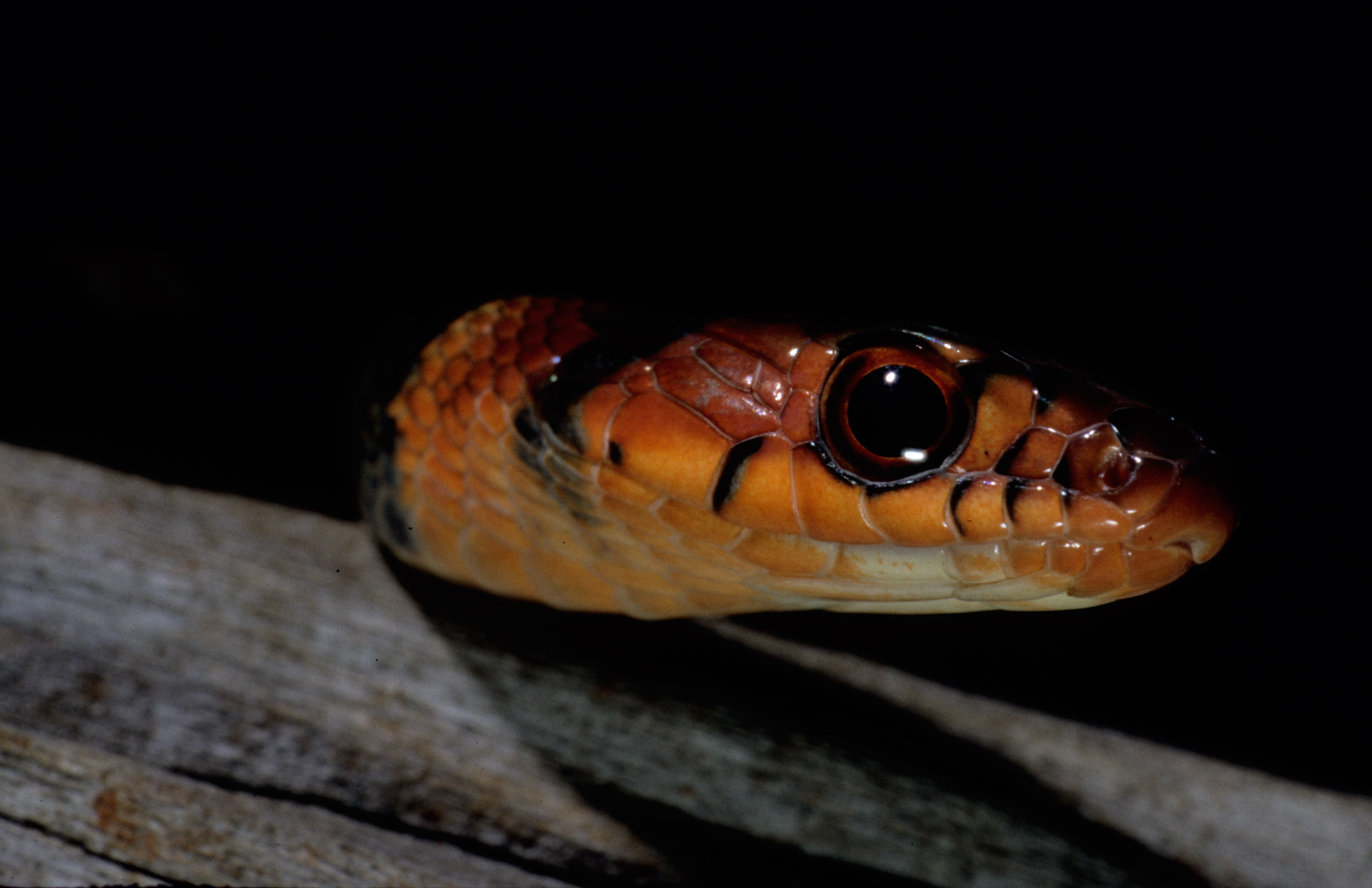

Conservation status
- Least Concern (IUCN 3.1)

Scientific classification
- Kingdom: Animalia
- Phylum: Chordata
- Class: Reptilia
- Order: Squamata
- Suborder: Serpentes
- Family: Colubridae
- Genus: Drymoluber
- Species: D. brazili

Binomial name
- Drymoluber brazili (Gomes, 1918)

= Drymoluber brazili =

Species of snake

Drymoluber brazili, the Brazilian woodland racer, is a species of non-venomous snake in the family Colubridae. The species is found in Brazil and Paraguay.
