= Brazilian Society of Physiology =

The Brazilian Society of Physiology (Sociedade Brasileira de Fisiologia, in Portuguese language, official abbreviation SBFis) is a learned society and association of students and professionals in physiology in Brazil. It is a member of the Brazilian Federation of Experimental Biology Societies (FeSBE) and of the Brazilian Society for the Advancement of Science (SBPC). Internationally, it is the country's representative at the International Union of Physiological Sciences (IUPS) and at the Latin American Association of Physiological Sciences.

The Society was founded on August 10, 1957, in the city of Rio de Janeiro. Among the founding members was a host of important Brazilian scientists of the century, such as Wilson Teixeira Beraldo, Oto G. Bier, Franklin Moura Campos, Alberto de Carvalho, Carlos Chagas, Nelson Chaves, Mário Vianna Dias, Carlos Ribeiro Diniz, Hiss Martins Ferreira, Paulo Enéas Galvão, José Moura Gonçalves, Aristides Pacheco Leão, Thales Martins, Erasmo G. Mendes, José Ribeiro do Valle, Fernando Ubatuba, Amadeu Cury, Haiti Moussatché, Eline S. Prado, José Leal Prado, Paulo Sawaya, Mauricio Rocha e Silva, Lauro Sollero and Baeta Viana. Prof. Thales Martins was elected the first president. Among its most noted past presidents were Wilson Beraldo, Hiss Martins Ferreira, Eduardo Moacyr Krieger, César Timo-Iaria and Gerhard Malnic.

The Society's official journal is the Brazilian Journal of Medical and Biological Research, which is published on-line by SciElo.

== See also ==
- Brazilian science and technology
