= Peptidyl-dipeptidase Dcp =

Class of enzymes

Identifiers
- EC no.: 3.4.15.5
- CAS no.: 395642-28-1

Databases
- IntEnz: IntEnz view
- BRENDA: BRENDA entry
- ExPASy: NiceZyme view
- KEGG: KEGG entry
- MetaCyc: metabolic pathway
- PRIAM: profile
- PDB structures: RCSB PDB PDBe PDBsum
Search
- PMC: articles
- PubMed: articles
- NCBI: proteins

Peptidyl-dipeptidase Dcp (EC 3.4.15.5, dipeptidyl carboxypeptidase (Dcp), dipeptidyl carboxypeptidase) is a metalloenzyme found in the cytoplasm of bacterium E. Coli responsible for the C-terminal cleavage of a variety of dipeptides and unprotected larger peptide chains. The enzyme does not hydrolyze bonds in which P1' is Proline, or both P1 and P1' are Glycine. Dcp consists of 680 amino acid residues that form into a single active monomer which aids in the intracellular degradation of peptides. Dcp coordinates to divalent zinc which sits in the pocket of the active site and is composed of four subsites: S_{1}’, S_{1}, S_{2}, and S_{3}, each subsite attracts certain amino acids at a specific position on the substrate enhancing the selectivity of the enzyme. The four subsites detect and bind different amino acid types on the substrate peptide in the P1 and P2 positions. Some metallic divalent cations such as Ni^{+2}, Cu^{+2}, and Zn^{+2} inhibit the function of the enzyme around 90%, whereas other cations such as Mn^{+2}, Ca^{+2}, Mg^{+2}, and Co^{+2} have slight catalyzing properties, and increase the function by around 20%. Basic amino acids such as Arginine bind preferably at the S_{1} site, the S_{2} site sits deeper in the enzyme therefore is restricted to bind hydrophobic amino acids with phenylalanine in the P2 position. Dcp is divided into two subdomains (I, and II), which are the two sides of the clam shell-like structure and has a deep inner cavity where a pair of histidine residues bind to the catalytic zinc ion in the active site. Peptidyl-Dipeptidase Dcp is classified like Angiotensin-I converting enzyme (ACE) which is also a carboxypeptidase involved in blood pressure regulation, but due to structural differences and peptidase activity between these two enzymes they had to be examined separately. ACE has endopeptidase activity, whereas Dcp strictly has exopeptidase activity based on its cytoplasmic location and therefore their mechanisms of action are differentiated. Another difference between these enzymes is that the activity of Peptidyl-Dipeptidase Dcp is not enhanced in the presence of chloride anions, whereas chloride enhances ACE activity.

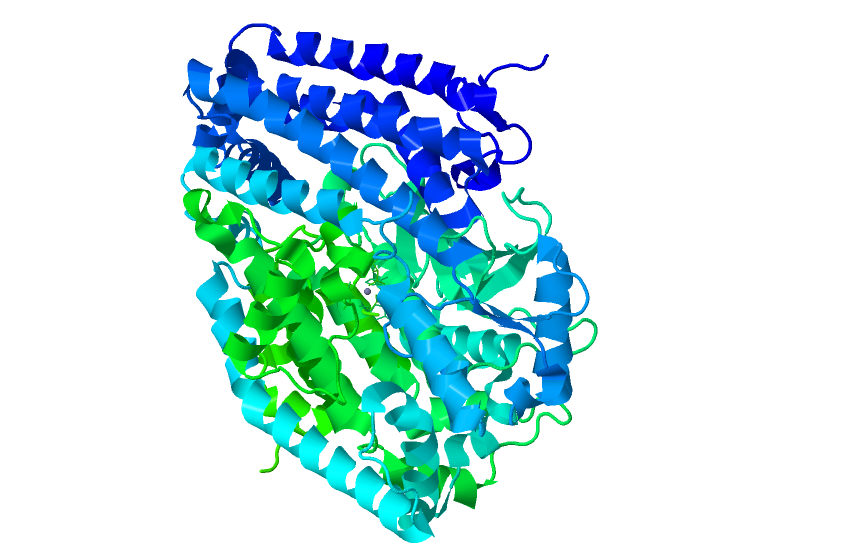
Overall Structure of the enzyme Peptidyl-Dipeptidase Dcp showing the clam shell-like structure and the active site in the center.

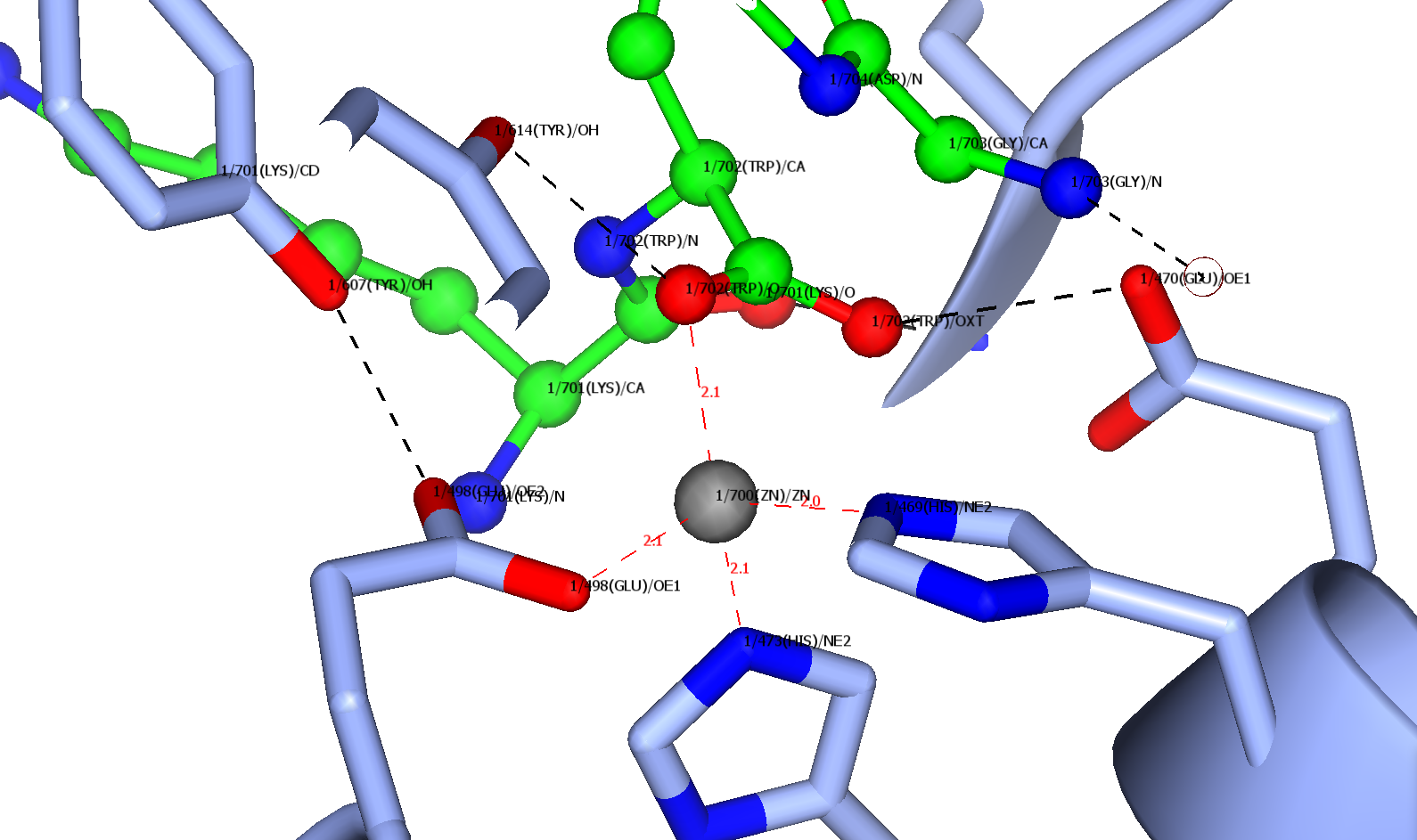
Image of the enzyme Peptidyl-Dipeptidase Dcp showing the active site where Zinc binds to two histidine residues and one glutamine residue
