= Autopharmacology =

Scientific study

Autopharmacology relates to the scientific study of the regulation of body functions by the activity of its naturally existent (or endogenous) chemical factors of the tissues. A more restricted definition would consider substances that were first identified as external agents which had a documented action on physiological functions, but later were discovered as existing as endogenous factors. The best example is the class of endorphins, which, as its name implies, were discovered to exist in the brain and have specific receptors in it, by investigations on the mechanism of action of opioids, such as morphine.

Historically, the first approach to the concept of autopharmacology began with British physiologist and pharmacologist Henry Dale in the 1910s, discovered the role of acetylcholine in synaptic transmission, and later proved by Austrian physiologist Otto Loewi, to be the neurotransmitter involved in the proximal synapses of the autonomic nervous system (initially named Vagusstoff by Loewi, and later identified as acetylcholine). The same happened to another autonomic neurotransmitter, noradrenaline (Akzeleransstoff by Loewi), which later proved to be chemically similar to a long used pharmacological agent, adrenaline, a hormone secreted by the adrenal glands. Both scientists were awarded the 1936 Nobel Prize for Physiology or Medicine for their pioneering and important contributions.

A research area where autopharmacology principles assumed great importance was that of pain and inflammation, due to the great number of endogenous messengers, transmitters and modulators involved in their complex response at molecular and cellular level. The control and regulation mechanisms of the circulatory system and renal functions and their interactions (such as the renin/angiotensin system) are also greatly influenced by autopharmacological agents; One of the autopharmacology pioneers was Professor Mauricio Rocha e Silva, leader of the team of Brazilian researchers who discovered bradykinin in 1948, an endogenous substance involved in hypotension in circulatory shock. Of course, all these systems are of extreme importance for clinical practice and for the discovery of new therapeutic drugs.

Endogenous substances that could fall under the concept of autopharmacology are:

- Endorphins
- Dynorphin
- Bradykinin
- Prostaglandins
- Angiotensin
- Secretin
- Gastrin
- Cholecystokinin
- Histamine
- Cannabinoids
- Substance P

The main scientific criterion for an autopharmacological agent is the discovery of specific membrane receptors for it and, hopefully, its transduction and cell signaling mechanisms.

The term was never much of a mainstream concept, and has fallen into disuse, as research on basic mechanisms has advanced. In a recent literature search on PubMed, only six titles refer to the term autopharmacology.
