= Xaa-Xaa-Pro tripeptidyl-peptidase =

Class of enzymes

Identifiers
- EC no.: 3.4.14.12

Databases
- IntEnz: IntEnz view
- BRENDA: BRENDA entry
- ExPASy: NiceZyme view
- KEGG: KEGG entry
- MetaCyc: metabolic pathway
- PRIAM: profile
- PDB structures: RCSB PDB PDBe PDBsum
Search
- PMC: articles
- PubMed: articles
- NCBI: proteins

Xaa-Xaa-Pro tripeptidyl-peptidase (EC 3.4.14.12, prolyltripeptidyl amino peptidase, prolyl tripeptidyl peptidase, prolyltripeptidyl aminopeptidase, PTP-A, TPP) is an enzyme. It catalyses the following chemical reaction

Hydrolysis of Xaa-Xaa-Pro!Yaa- releasing the N-terminal tripeptide of a peptide with Pro as the third residue (position P1) and where Yaa is not proline

This cell-surface-associated serine exopeptidase is found in the Gram-negative, anaerobic bacterium Porphyromonas gingivalis.
