= Low-molecular-weight kininogen =

Form of kininogen identified in mice, guinea pigs, and whales

kininogen 1

Identifiers
- Symbol: KNG1
- Alt. symbols: KNG, BDK
- NCBI gene: 3827
- HGNC: 6383
- OMIM: 612358
- RefSeq: NM_001102416
- UniProt: P01042

Other data
- Locus: Chr. 3 q21-qter
Search for
- Structures: Swiss-model
- Domains: InterPro

Low-molecular-weight kininogen is a form of kininogen, which has been identified in mice, guinea pigs, and whales.

It is also found in humans.
