= Bradykinin =

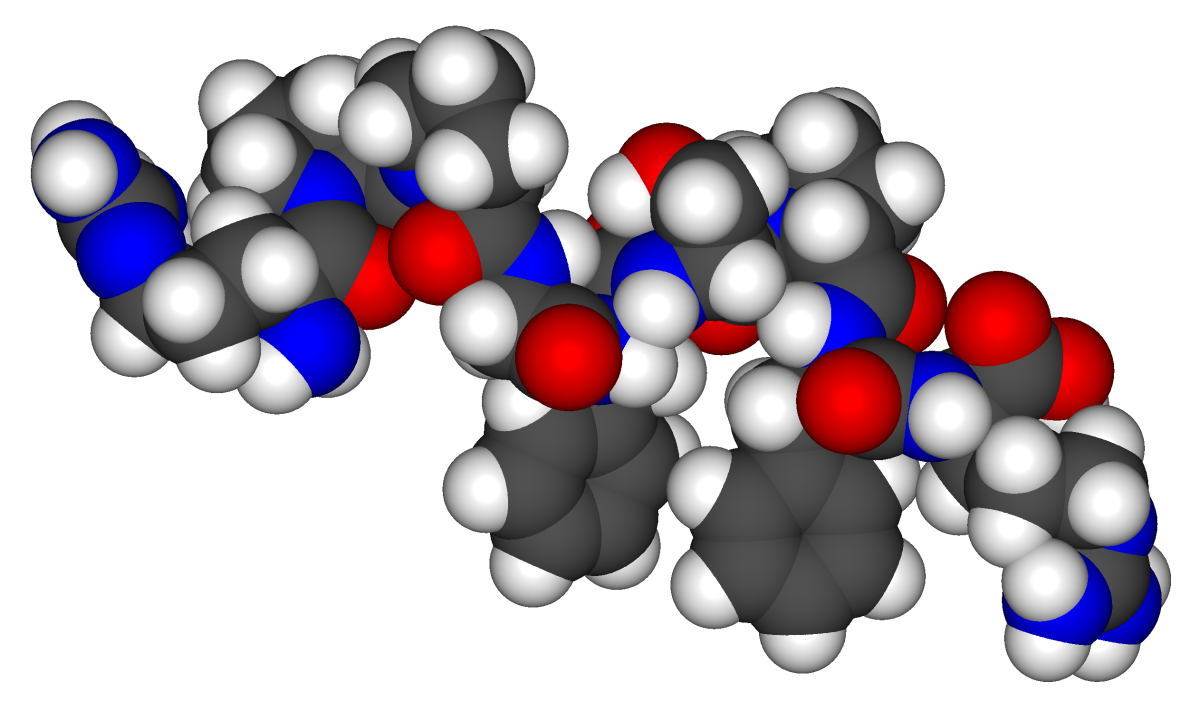

Names
- IUPAC name Bradykinin
- Systematic IUPAC name (2S)-2-{(1^{2}S,3^{2}S,9S,12S,14^{2}S,17S)-1^{1}-[(2S)-2-Amino-5-(carbamimidoylamino)pentanoyl]-9-benzyl-12-(hydroxymethyl)-2,4,7,10,13,15-hexaoxo-5,8,11,16-tetraaza-1(2),3,14(1,2)-tripyrrolidina-19-benzenanonadecaphane-17-carboxamido}-5-(carbamimidoylamino)pentanoic acid

Identifiers
CAS Number	58-82-2
3D model (JSmol)	Interactive image
ChEBI	CHEBI:3165
ChEMBL	ChEMBL406291
ChemSpider	388341
ECHA InfoCard	100.000.362
IUPHAR/BPS	649
MeSH	Bradykinin
PubChem CID	439201
UNII	S8TIM42R2W
CompTox Dashboard (EPA)	DTXSID50893681
- InChI: InChI=1S/C50H73N15O11/c51-32(16-7-21-56-49(52)53)45(72)65-25-11-20-39(65)47(74)64-24-9-18-37(64)43(70)58-28-40(67)59-34(26-30-12-3-1-4-13-30)41(68)62-36(29-66)46(73)63-23-10-19-38(63)44(71)61-35(27-31-14-5-2-6-15-31)42(69)60-33(48(75)76)17-8-22-57-50(54)55/h1-6,12-15,32-39,66H,7-11,16-29,51H2,(H,58,70)(H,59,67)(H,60,69)(H,61,71)(H,62,68)(H,75,76)(H4,52,53,56)(H4,54,55,57)/t32-,33-,34-,35-,36-,37-,38-,39-/m0/s1 Key: QXZGBUJJYSLZLT-FDISYFBBSA-N; InChI=1/C50H73N15O11/c51-32(16-7-21-56-49(52)53)45(72)65-25-11-20-39(65)47(74)64-24-9-18-37(64)43(70)58-28-40(67)59-34(26-30-12-3-1-4-13-30)41(68)62-36(29-66)46(73)63-23-10-19-38(63)44(71)61-35(27-31-14-5-2-6-15-31)42(69)60-33(48(75)76)17-8-22-57-50(54)55/h1-6,12-15,32-39,66H,7-11,16-29,51H2,(H,58,70)(H,59,67)(H,60,69)(H,61,71)(H,62,68)(H,75,76)(H4,52,53,56)(H4,54,55,57)/t32-,33-,34-,35-,36-,37-,38-,39-/m0/s1 Key: QXZGBUJJYSLZLT-FDISYFBBBG
- SMILES: O=C(N[C@H](C(=O)N[C@H](C(=O)O)CCC/N=C(\N)N)Cc1ccccc1)[C@H]5N(C(=O)[C@@H](NC(=O)[C@@H](NC(=O)CNC(=O)[C@H]3N(C(=O)[C@H]2N(C(=O)[C@@H](N)CCC/N=C(\N)N)CCC2)CCC3)Cc4ccccc4)CO)CCC5

Properties
Chemical formula	C_{50}H_{73}N_{15}O_{11}
Molar mass	1060.228 g·mol^{−1}
- Except where otherwise noted, data are given for materials in their standard state (at 25 °C [77 °F], 100 kPa). verify (what is ?) Infobox references

kininogen 1

Identifiers
- Symbol: KNG1
- Alt. symbols: KNG, BDK
- NCBI gene: 3827
- HGNC: 6383
- OMIM: 612358
- RefSeq: NM_001102416
- UniProt: P01042

Other data
- Locus: Chr. 3 q21-qter
Search for
- Structures: Swiss-model
- Domains: InterPro

Bradykinin

Identifiers
- Symbol: Bradykinin
- Pfam: PF06753
- InterPro: IPR009608
Available protein structures:
- PDB: IPR009608 PF06753 (ECOD; PDBsum)
- AlphaFold: IPR009608; PF06753

Bradykinin (BK) (from Greek brady- 'slow' + -kinin, kīn(eîn) 'to move') is a peptide that promotes inflammation. It causes arterioles to dilate (enlarge) via the release of prostacyclin, nitric oxide, and endothelium-derived hyperpolarizing factor, and induces smooth muscle constraction via prostaglandin F2. Bradykinin consists of nine amino acids, and is a physiologically and pharmacologically active peptide of the kinin group of proteins.

A class of drugs called angiotensin-converting-enzyme inhibitors (ACE inhibitors) increase bradykinin levels by inhibiting its degradation, thereby increasing its blood pressure-lowering effect. ACE inhibitors are used to treat hypertension and heart failure.

== Structure ==
Bradykinin, sometimes referred to as BK, is a 9–amino acid peptide chain. The amino acid sequence of bradykinin is: Arg-Pro-Pro-Gly-Phe-Ser-Pro-Phe-Arg (RPPGFSPFR). Its empirical formula is therefore C_{50}H_{73}N_{15}O_{11}.

== Metabolism ==
The kinin–kallikrein system makes bradykinin by proteolytic cleavage of its kininogen precursor, high-molecular-weight kininogen (HMWK or HK), by the enzyme kallikrein. Moreover, there is evidence that plasmin, a fibrinolytic enzyme, is able to generate bradykinin after HMWK cleavage.

In humans, bradykinin is broken down by many different kininases: angiotensin-converting enzyme (ACE, kininase II), neprilysin, NEP2, aminopeptidase P (APP), carboxypeptidase N (CPN, kininase I), Carboxypeptidase M, Neutral endopeptidase 24.15, Endothelin converting enzyme-1, Endothelin converting enzyme-2.

== Function ==
=== Effects ===
Bradykinin is a potent endothelium-dependent vasodilator and mild diuretic, which may cause a lowering of the blood pressure. It also causes contraction of non-vascular smooth muscle in the bronchus and gut, increases vascular permeability and is also involved in the mechanism of pain.

During inflammation, it is released locally from mast cells and basophils during tissue damage. Specifically in relation to pain, bradykinin has been shown to sensitize TRPV1 receptors, thus lowering the temperature threshold at which they activate, thus presumably contributing to allodynia.

Initial secretion of bradykinin post-natally causes constriction and eventual atrophy of the ductus arteriosus, forming the ligamentum arteriosum between the pulmonary trunk and aortic arch. It also plays a role in the constriction and eventual occlusion of a number of other fetal vessels, including the umbilical arteries and vein. The differential vasoconstriction of these fetal vessels compared to the vasodilator response of other vessels suggests that the walls of these fetal vessels are different from other vessels.

=== Receptors ===
- The B_{1} receptor (also called bradykinin receptor B1) is expressed only as a result of tissue injury, and is presumed to play a role in chronic pain. This receptor has been also described to play a role in inflammation. It was shown that the kinin B_{1} receptor recruits neutrophils via the chemokine CXCL5 production. Moreover, endothelial cells have been described as a potential source for this B_{1} receptor-CXCL5 pathway.
- The B_{2} receptor is constitutively expressed and participates in bradykinin's vasodilatory role.

The kinin B_{1} and B_{2} receptors belong to G protein coupled receptor (GPCR) family.

== Disorders ==
Bradykinin is also thought to be the cause of the dry cough in some patients on widely prescribed angiotensin-converting enzyme (ACE) inhibitor drugs. It is thought that bradykinin is converted to inactive metabolites by ACE, therefore inhibition of this enzyme leads to increased levels of bradykinin; increased bradykinin sensitizes somatosensory fibers and thus causes hyperalgesia. Bradykinin may mediate this via pro-inflammatory peptides (e.g. substance P, neuropeptide Y) and a local release of histamine.

In severe cases, the elevation of bradykinin may result in angioedema, a medical emergency. People of African descent have up to five times increased risk of ACE inhibitor induced angioedema due to hereditary predisposing risk factors such as hereditary angioedema. This refractory cough is a common cause for stopping ACE inhibitor therapy.

Overactivation of bradykinin is thought to play a role in a rare disease called hereditary angioedema.

Low levels of bradykinin in the body correlate with obesity in adolescents; it has been proposed that bradykinin can be used as a biomarker for metabolic syndrome.

Bradykinins have been implicated in a number of cancer progression processes. Increased levels of bradykinins resulting from ACE inhibitor use have been associated with increased lung cancer risks. Bradykinins have been implicated in cell proliferation and migration in gastric cancers, and bradykinin antagonists have been investigated as anti-cancer agents.

Bradykinin has been proposed as an explanation for many symptoms associated with COVID-19, and some studies have found a correlation between bradykinin levels and disease severity.

== Therapeutic implications ==
A bradykinin-potentiating factor (BPF) which increases both the duration and magnitude of the effects of bradykinin on vasodilation and the consequent fall in blood pressure, was discovered in Bothrops jararaca venom. On the basis of this finding, a non-protein analog of BPF which was effective orally was developed: the first angiotensin converting enzyme inhibitor captopril. It was approved by the FDA for the treatment of hypertension in 1981.

Currently, bradykinin inhibitors (antagonists) are being developed as potential therapies for hereditary angioedema. Icatibant is one such inhibitor. Additional bradykinin inhibitors exist. It has long been known in animal studies that bromelain, a substance obtained from the stems and leaves of the pineapple plant, suppresses trauma-induced swelling caused by the release of bradykinin into the bloodstream and tissues. Other substances that act as bradykinin inhibitors include aloe and polyphenols, substances found in red wine and green tea.

== History ==
Bradykinin was discovered in 1948 by three Brazilian physiologists and pharmacologists working at the Biological Institute, in São Paulo, Brazil, led by Dr. Maurício Rocha e Silva. Together with colleagues Wilson Teixeira Beraldo and Gastão Rosenfeld, they discovered the powerful hypotensive effects of bradykinin in animal preparations. Bradykinin was detected in the blood plasma of animals after the addition of venom extracted from the Bothrops jararaca (Brazilian lancehead snake), brought by Rosenfeld from the Butantan Institute. The discovery was part of a continuing study on circulatory shock and proteolytic enzymes related to the toxicology of snake bites, started by Rocha e Silva as early as 1939. Bradykinin was to prove a new autopharmacological principle, i.e., a substance that is released in the body by a metabolic modification from precursors, which are pharmacologically active. According to B.J. Hagwood, Rocha e Silva's biographer:

The discovery of bradykinin has led to a new understanding of many physiological and pathological phenomena including circulatory shock induced by venoms and toxins.

Bradykinin is cleaved by snake venom proteases. Based on this property, it can be used to screen herbal medicines for anti-venomous effects.

The first comprehensive computational model of bradykinin was developed in the USSR in the mid-1970s by a team led by Stanislav Galaktionov.

== See also ==
- Hypotensive transfusion reaction
