= Sebastião Leme =

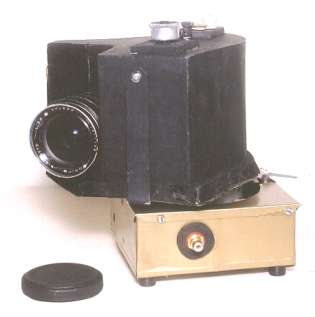
Leme's 360° panoramic camera

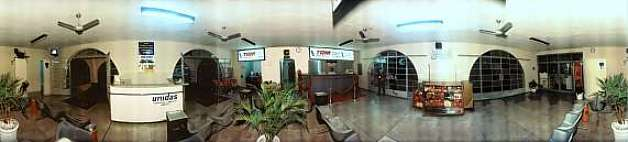
Marília Airport, São Paulo, Brasil

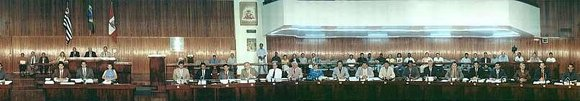
Câmara Municipal of Marília, São Paulo, Brasil – photo by Sebastião Carvalho Leme

Sebastião Carvalho Leme (13 July 1918 – 25 April 2007), was a photographer from Marília, São Paulo, Brazil. He is credited with inventing the Leme panoramic camera, a 360° camera.

== Summary ==
In 1957, an entrepreneur requested a picture of his buildings, which stood at three of the corners of a street-crossing, and he wanted to show the group of buildings in one single photo, which would have to cover 360°. Using a Rolleiflex with a panoramic head, ten negatives were taken that, enlarged and mounted, resulted in a 360° photo. Leme then addressed the challenge of taking a 360° photo in a single negative.

The demonstration of his eventual solution consisted of a lens mounted in a small, empty tomato purée can, an internal device which is the principle of the invention, and a piece of film fixed inside the can. He tested it in front of the Senai building by rotating the lens by hand. The film, when developed, precariously confirmed that it was possible to take 360° photos.

The first prototype was entirely mechanical. Three prototypes were made, and they were improved over one year. In the meantime, sure of having found a solution to the problem of taking 360° photos, Leme applied for a patent registration, a process that went on for some years.

On April 23, 1962 the patent was awarded under No. 61.472. About 20 years after the patent was awarded, a similar system appeared in the United States, but without the internal device mentioned above. The camera remained out of use for 15 years. At the end of 1997, it was taken up again, improved, and put to use once more.

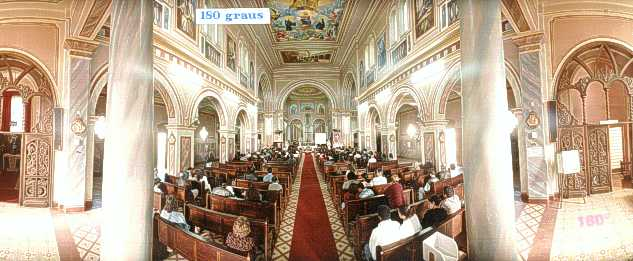
Cathedral in Marília, São Paulo, Brasil

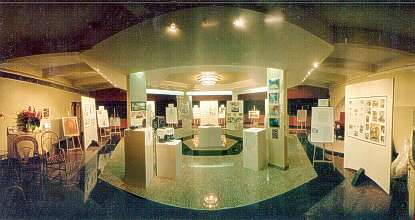

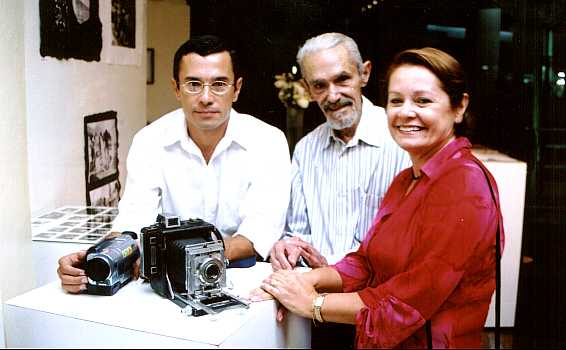

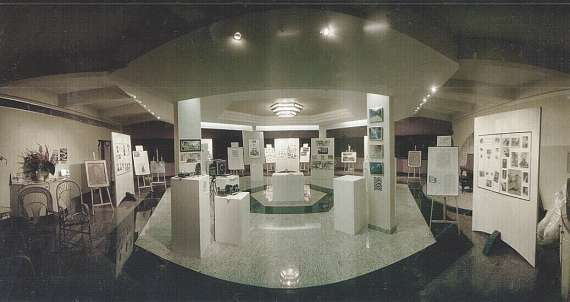
