= Wilson Teixeira Beraldo =

Brazilian physician (1917–1998)

- Born: 20 April 1917; Silvianópolis, Minas Gerais, Brazil
- Died: 28 July 1998 (aged 81); Belo Horizonte, Minas Gerais
- Education: Federal University of Minas Gerais
- Known for: Discovery of bradykinin
- Scientific career
- Fields: Medicine, physiology
- Workplaces: University of São Paulo, Federal University of Minas Gerais

Wilson Teixeira Beraldo (20 April 1917 – 28 July 1998) was a Brazilian physician and physiologist, a co-discoverer of bradykinin.

Beraldo graduated in medicine in 1942, having studied at the Federal University of Minas Gerais. He was also associate professor of physiology of the Faculty of Medicine of the University of São Paulo, and full professor and chairman of physiology of the Faculty of Medicine of the Federal University of Minas Gerais (1962). Beraldo was also a fellow of the Rockefeller Foundation (1949) and of the British Council (1954), a member of the New York Academy of Sciences and of the Brazilian Academy of Sciences.

As a scientific leader, Beraldo was very important for the development of physiology in Brazil, and of the scientific establishment in general. He was a founding member of the Brazilian Association for Advancement of Science and its honorary president, of the Brazilian Society of Physiology.

While in São Paulo, Beraldo was part of the pharmacological research team of the Biological Institute of São Paulo, led by Maurício Rocha e Silva, which, in 1949, discovered bradykinin, a new autopharmacological principle which was released in the blood by the snake venom of the jararaca (lancehead), Bothrops jararaca. Beraldo had also an important role in demonstrating that urinary kallikrein is of renal origin and not pancreatic, as it was thought, and that its oxytocic activity is a direct action, rather than through the intermediate formation of kinins.

== Bibliography ==
- Beraldo, W.T. and Andrade, S.P.: Discovery of bradykinin and the kallikrein-kinin system. In: The Kinin System. Academic Press, San Diego, CA, 1997.
- Beraldo WT, Siqueira G, Heneine IF. Kallikrein and kallikrein inhibitor in rats. Acta Physiol Lat Am. 1974;24(5):460-3.
- Rocha e Silva M, Beraldo WT, Rosenfeld G. Bradykinin, a hypotensive and smooth muscle stimulating factor released from plasma globulin by snake venoms and by trypsin. Am J Physiol.. 1949;156:261-273.
