= Biological Institute (São Paulo) =

Applied research centre in São paulo, Brazil since 1924

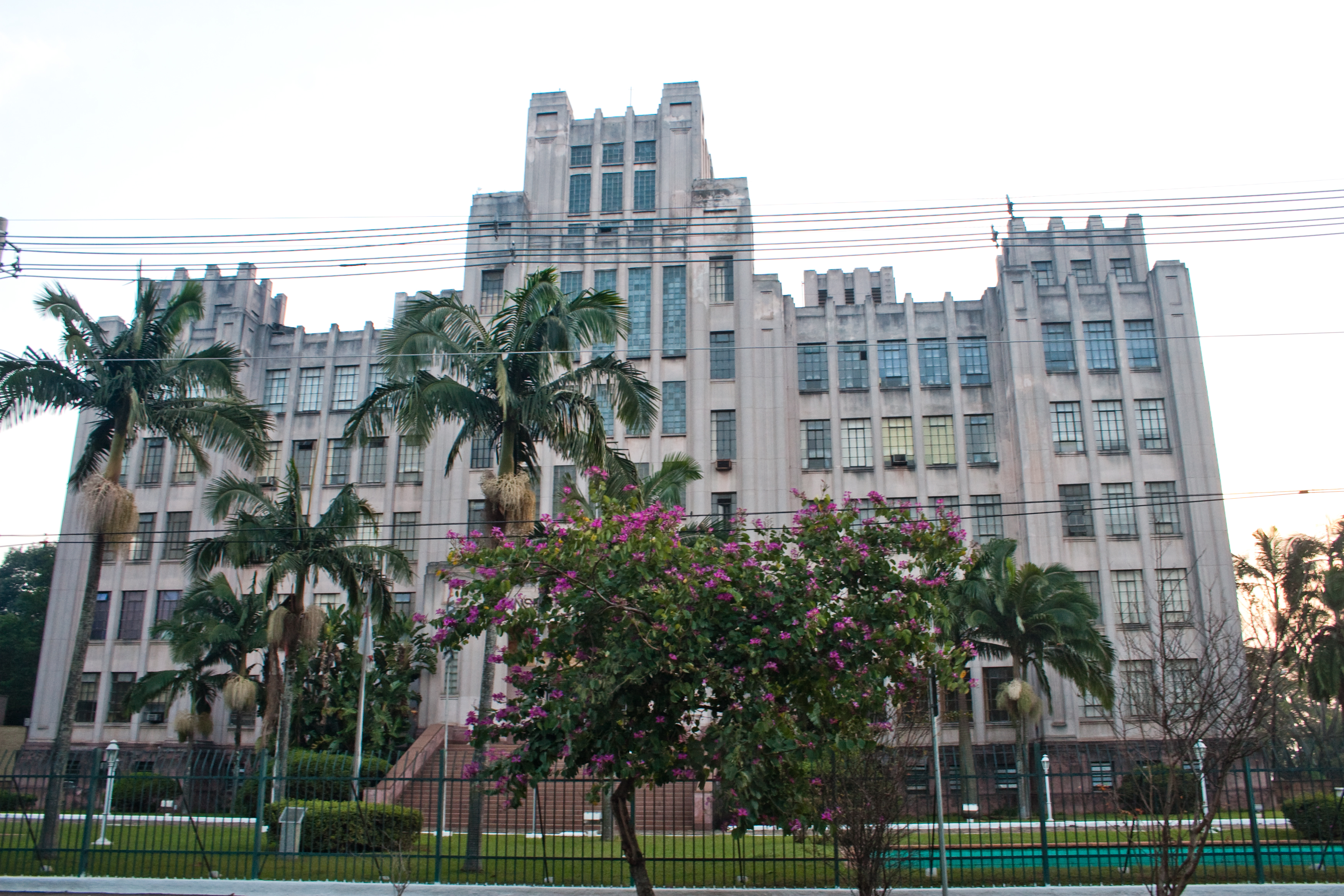
The Biological Institute

The Biological Institute (Portuguese: Instituto Biológico) is an applied research center established in 1924 in São Paulo, Brazil. It is a governmental organisation concerned with the prevention of zoonoses and foodborne animal pathogens such as rabies and tuberculosis, sanitary advertisement campaigns, alternatives to the chemical control of diseases such as organic farming and biological control.

Among its main achievements are the biological control of the coffee borer beetle in the 1920s in Brazil, the discovery of bradykinin, and the production of vaccines that combat the Newcastle disease, foot-and-mouth disease and the black plague in pigs.

== History ==
Brazil used to be an important world coffee supplier in the international commodities markets in the beginning of the 20th century. Especially in the state of São Paulo, coffee became a major source of income from exports, and newly-rich coffee barons were sprouting all over the state.

In the early 1920s, coffee farmers in the state of São Paulo were having a hard time in controlling the coffee borer beetle (Hypothenemus hampei), a bug that destroys coffee berries by perforating them (perforated coffee berries have no value in the commodities market). Gabriel Ribeiro dos Santos, the Secretary of Agriculture of the state of São Paulo at that time, has organised a commission of scientists in May 1924 to identify the coffee borer beetle and prevent further losses in the coffee fields. A report was delivered to the Secretary of Agriculture, and the actual research started in the same year with Arthur Neiva, Adalberto Queiros Teles and Edmundo Navarro, who worked in two chemistry and entomology laboratories.

The goal of the Commission was to find out more information about the parasite, and hence discover effective ways of preventing its growth. The academic studies in process were widely advertised among more than 1,300 coffee farms, or about 50 million farmers overall, in order to apply the results of the ongoing research. Arthur Neiva then ended the research at the end of the year, and the results from such a massive scientific and technical experiment soon arrived, and the damages caused by the beetle were finally under biological control. By importing the ectoparasitoid Prorops nasuta from Uganda and using it against the coffee borer beetle, the Commission was able to mitigate the losses in the coffee farms.

The catastrophic uprising of the coffee borer beetle, which caught both farmers and the government short and unprepared, and the subsequent fast control of the bug founded on scientific research have shown politicians that it was impossible to protect agriculture from parasites and diseases without a permanent fitosanitary organisation, based on active research and specialised technicians and scientists.

On 26 December 1927, a law enacted the creation of the Instituto Biológico de Defesa Agrícola e Animal (Biological Institute of Agricultural and Veterinary Defence); its current name, Instituto Biológico (Biological Institute), was applied in 1937.

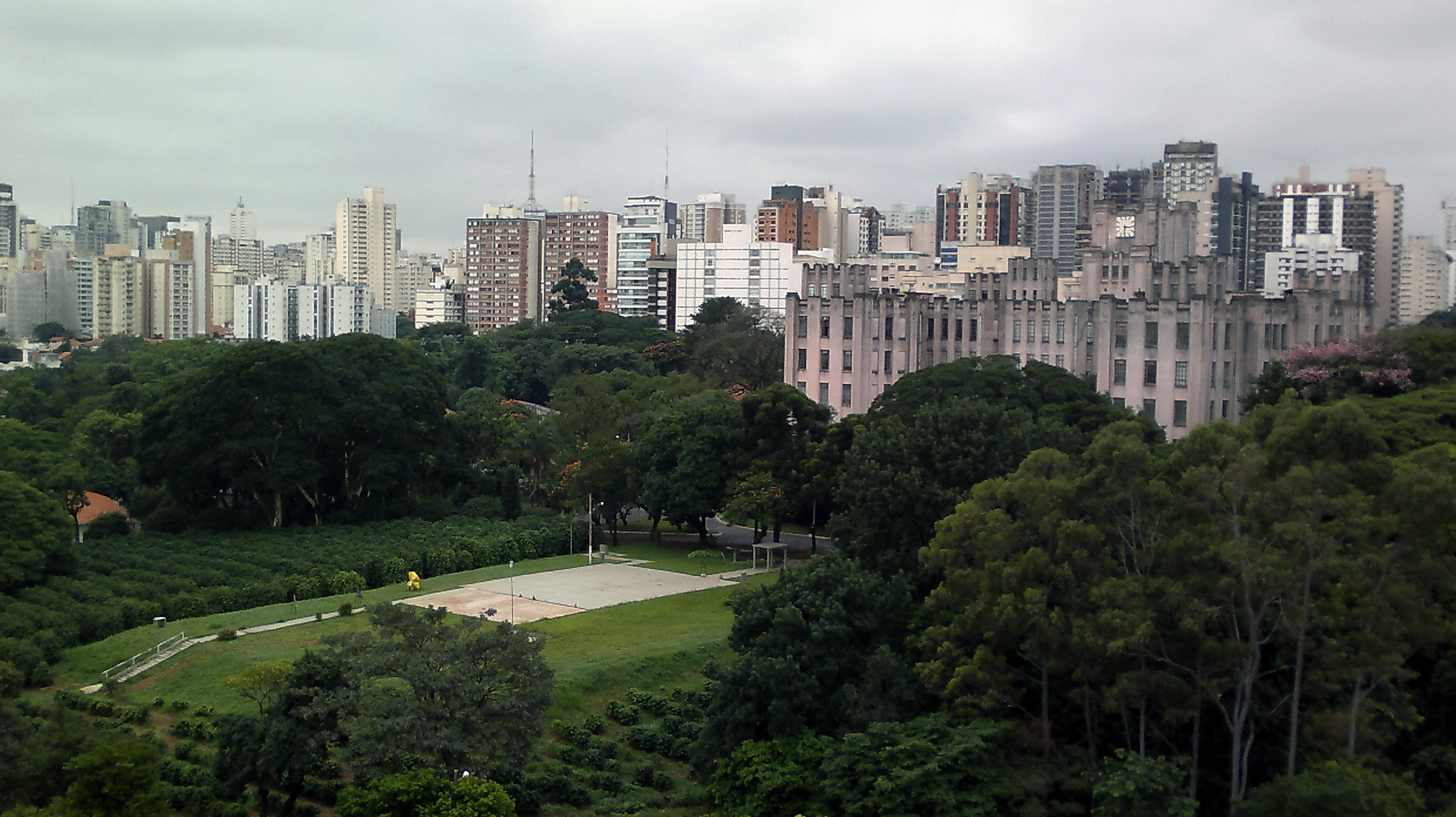
The Biological Institute of São Paulo

== The Institute ==
In 1928, an area of 239,000 square metres near Ibirapuera Park, known as "Campo do Barreto", was donated to the Institute for the construction of its research centre. The construction works took 17 years to be completed, and the building was finally inaugurated on 25 January 1945. Some of the construction materials were donated by private firms and wealthy individuals from the farming elites at that time. The institute also has a symbolic plantation of coffee in the middle of the greatest megalopolis of South America.
