= Angiotensin-converting enzyme =

Mammalian protein found in humans

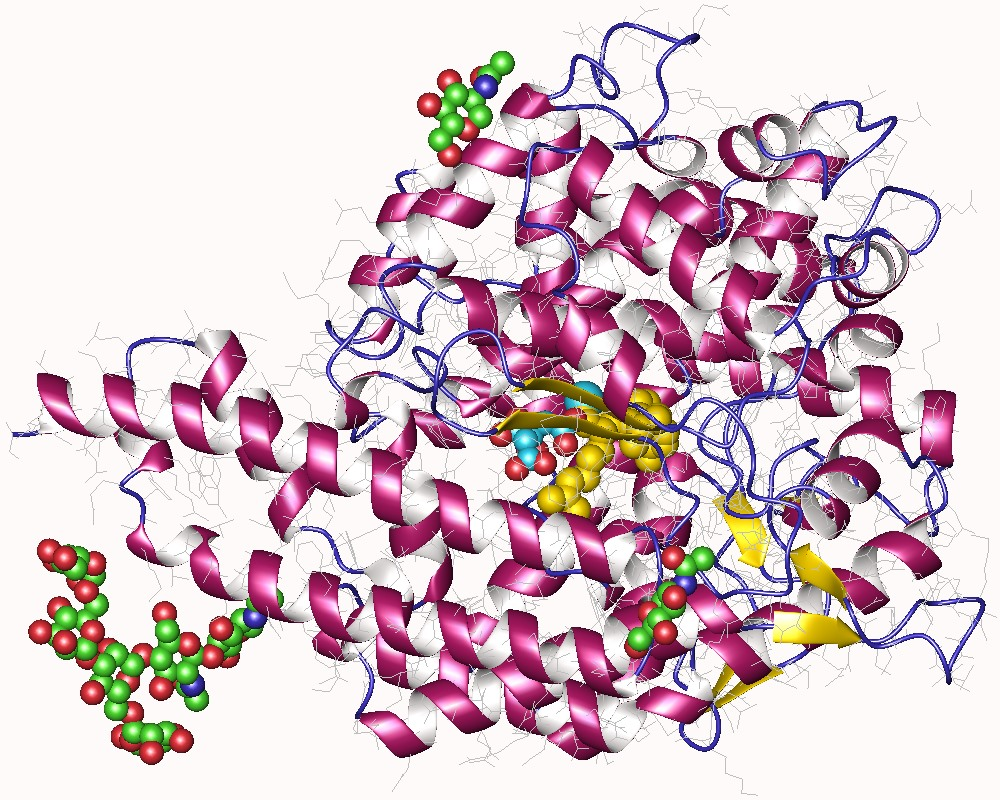
- Angiotensin-converting enzyme monomer, Drosophila melanogaster

Identifiers
- EC no.: 3.4.15.1
- CAS no.: 9015-82-1

Databases
- BRENDA: enzyme data
- ExPASy: NiceZyme view
- KEGG: enzyme entry
- MetaCyc: metabolic pathway
- Rhea: reactions
- PDB structures: RCSB PDB PDBe PDBsum
Search
- PMC: articles
- PubMed: articles
- NCBI: proteins

ACE
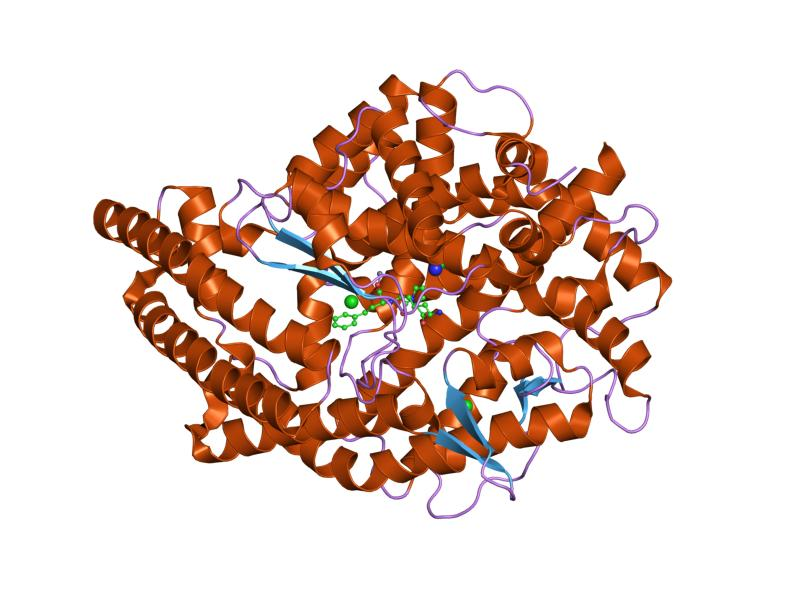

Identifiers
- Aliases: ACE, angiotensin I converting enzyme, ACE1, CD143, DCP, DCP1, ICH, MVCD3, Angiotensin-converting enzyme
- External IDs: OMIM: 106180; MGI: 87874; GeneCards: ACE
Available structures
PDB	Ortholog search: PDBe RCSB
PDB	List of PDB id codes 1O86, 1O8A, 1UZE, 1UZF, 2C6F, 2C6N, 2IUL, 2IUX, 2OC2, 2XY9, 2XYD, 2YDM, 3BKK, 3BKL, 3NXQ, 4APH, 4APJ, 3L3N, 4BXK, 4BZR, 4BZS, 4C2N, 4C2O, 4C2P, 4C2Q, 4C2R, 4CA5, 4CA6, 4UFA, 4UFB, 5AMB, 5AM9, 5AM8, 5AMC, 5AMA
Enzyme activity
EC #	BRENDA	ExPASy	KEGG	MetaCyc
3.4.15.1	↗	↗	↗	↗

Gene location (Human)
Chr.	Chromosome 17 (human)
Band	17q23.3	Start	63,477,061 bp
Band	17q23.3	End	63,498,380 bp

Gene location (Mouse)
Chr.	Chromosome 11 (mouse)
Band	11 E1|11 68.84 cM	Start	105,858,771 bp
Band	11 E1|11 68.84 cM	End	105,880,790 bp
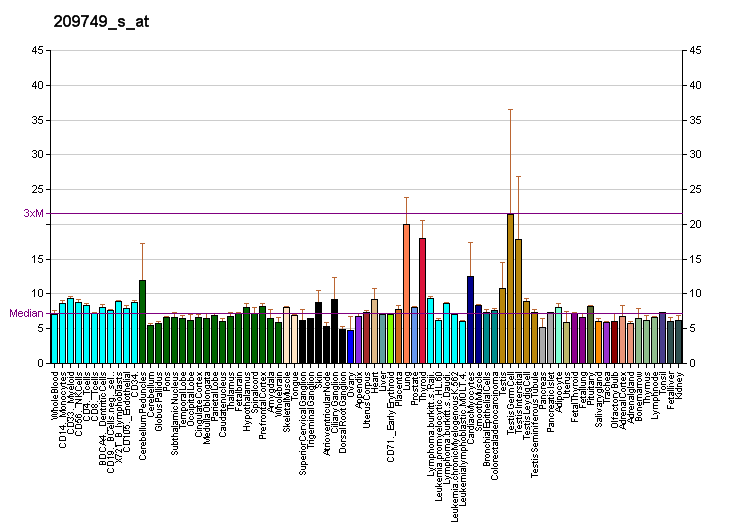
RNA expression pattern
Bgee	Human / Mouse (ortholog); Top expressed in: mucosa of ileum; right testis; left testis; jejunal mucosa; mucosa of transverse colon; duodenum; upper lobe of left lung; apex of heart; right uterine tube; right lung / Top expressed in: choroid plexus of fourth ventricle; seminiferous tubule; spermatid; descending aorta; right lung; jejunum; right lung lobe; left lung; choroidal fissure; Epithelium of choroid plexus; More reference expression data
BioGPS	More reference expression data
Gene ontology
Molecular function	tripeptidyl-peptidase activity; zinc ion binding; exopeptidase activity; endopeptidase activity; metal ion binding; mitogen-activated protein kinase binding; bradykinin receptor binding; peptidase activity; protein binding; carboxypeptidase activity; chloride ion binding; actin binding; mitogen-activated protein kinase kinase binding; hydrolase activity; metallodipeptidase activity; metallopeptidase activity; peptidyl-dipeptidase activity; dipeptidyl-peptidase activity
Cellular component	cytoplasm; integral component of membrane; endosome; membrane; lysosome; extracellular exosome; external side of plasma membrane; extracellular region; plasma membrane; extracellular space
Biological process	regulation of renal output by angiotensin; antigen processing and presentation of peptide antigen via MHC class I; amyloid-beta metabolic process; angiotensin maturation; blood vessel remodeling; regulation of vasoconstriction; hematopoietic stem cell differentiation; regulation of angiotensin metabolic process; regulation of smooth muscle cell migration; mononuclear cell proliferation; regulation of systemic arterial blood pressure by renin-angiotensin; arachidonic acid secretion; peptide catabolic process; blood vessel diameter maintenance; proteolysis; kidney development; neutrophil mediated immunity; positive regulation of systemic arterial blood pressure; spermatogenesis; regulation of blood pressure; posttranscriptional regulation of gene expression; negative regulation of gene expression; negative regulation of protein binding; positive regulation of protein binding; hormone catabolic process; heart contraction; positive regulation of protein tyrosine kinase activity; cell proliferation in bone marrow; positive regulation of peptidyl-tyrosine autophosphorylation; regulation of hematopoietic stem cell proliferation; negative regulation of gap junction assembly; positive regulation of peptidyl-cysteine S-nitrosylation; positive regulation of blood pressure
Sources:Amigo / QuickGO
Orthologs
Databases	NCBI: entry; OMA: entry
Species	Human	Mouse
Entrez	1636	11421
Ensembl	ENSG00000159640	ENSMUSG00000020681
UniProt	P12821	P09470
RefSeq (mRNA)	NM_000789; NM_001178057; NM_152830; NM_152831; NM_001382700 NM_001382701; NM_001382702	NM_009598; NM_207624; NM_001281819
RefSeq (protein)	NP_000780; NP_001171528; NP_690043; NP_001369629; NP_001369630 NP_001369631	NP_001268748; NP_033728; NP_997507
Location (UCSC)	Chr 17: 63.48 – 63.5 Mb	Chr 11: 105.86 – 105.88 Mb
PubMed search
- Wikidata
View/Edit Human	View/Edit Mouse

Angiotensin-converting enzyme (EC 3.4.15.1), or ACE, is a central component of the renin–angiotensin system (RAS), which controls blood pressure by regulating the volume of fluids in the body. It converts the hormone angiotensin I to the active vasoconstrictor angiotensin II. Therefore, ACE indirectly increases blood pressure by causing blood vessels to constrict. ACE inhibitors are widely used as pharmaceutical drugs for treatment of cardiovascular diseases.

Other lesser known functions of ACE are degradation of bradykinin, substance P and amyloid beta-protein.

== Function ==
ACE hydrolyzes peptides by the removal of a dipeptide from the C-terminus. Likewise it converts the inactive decapeptide angiotensin I to the octapeptide angiotensin II by removing the dipeptide His-Leu.

Proposed ACE catalytic mechanism

ACE is a central component of the renin–angiotensin system (RAS), which controls blood pressure by regulating the volume of fluids in the body.

Schematic diagram of the renin–angiotensin–aldosterone system

Angiotensin II is a potent vasoconstrictor in a substrate concentration-dependent manner. Angiotensin II binds to the type 1 angiotensin II receptor (AT1), which sets off a number of actions that result in vasoconstriction and therefore increased blood pressure.

Anatomical diagram of the renin–angiotensin system, showing the role of ACE at the lungs

ACE is also part of the kinin–kallikrein system where it degrades bradykinin, a potent vasodilator, and other vasoactive peptides.

Kininase II is the same as angiotensin-converting enzyme. Thus, the same enzyme (ACE) that generates a vasoconstrictor (ANG II) also disposes of vasodilators (bradykinin).

== Mechanism ==
ACE is a zinc metalloproteinase. The zinc center catalyses the peptide hydrolysis. Reflecting the critical role of zinc, ACE can be inhibited by metal-chelating agents.

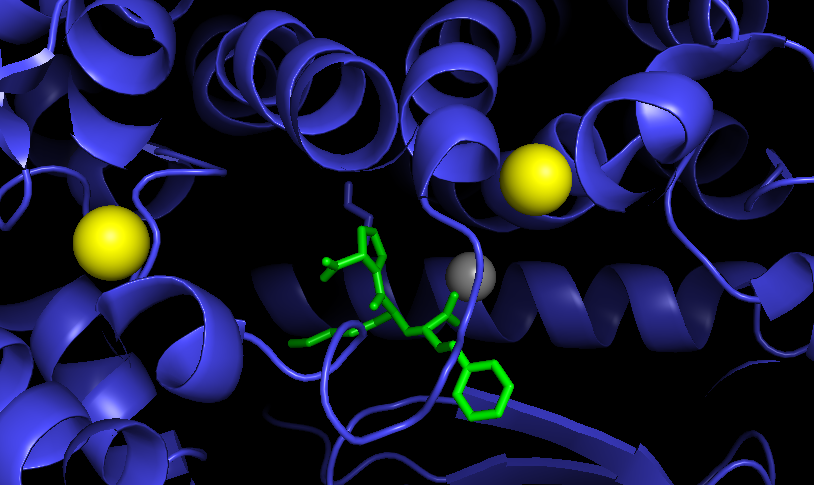
ACE in complex with inhibitor lisinopril, zinc cation shown in grey, chloride anions in yellow. Based on PyMOL rendering of PDB 1o86. The picture shows that lisinopril is a competitive inhibitor, since it and angiotensin I are similar structurally. Both bind to the active site of ACE. The structure of the ACE-lisinopril complex was confirmed by X-ray crystallography.

The E384 residue is mechanistically critical. As a general base, it deprotonates the zinc-bound water, producing a nucleophilic Zn-OH center. The resulting ammonium group then is a general acid to cleave the C-N bond.

The function of the chloride ion is very complex and is highly debated. The anion activation by chloride is a characteristic feature of ACE. It was experimentally determined that the activation of hydrolysis by chloride is highly dependent on the substrate. While it increases hydrolysis rates for e.g. Hip-His-Leu it inhibits hydrolysis of other substrates like Hip-Ala-Pro. Under physiological conditions the enzyme reaches about 60% of its maximal activity toward angiotensin I while it reaches its full activity toward bradykinin. It is therefore assumed that the function of the anion activation in ACE provides high substrate specificity. Other theories say that the chloride might simply stabilize the overall structure of the enzyme.

== Genetics ==
The ACE gene, ACE, encodes two isozymes. The somatic isozyme is expressed in many tissues, mainly in the lung, including vascular endothelial cells, epithelial kidney cells, and testicular Leydig cells, whereas the germinal is expressed only in sperm. Brain tissue has ACE enzyme, which takes part in local RAS and converts Aβ42 (which aggregates into plaques) to Aβ40 (which is thought to be less toxic) forms of beta amyloid. The latter is predominantly a function of N domain portion on the ACE enzyme. ACE inhibitors that cross the blood–brain barrier and have preferentially selected N-terminal activity may therefore cause accumulation of Aβ42 and progression of dementia.

== Disease relevance ==
ACE inhibitors are widely used as pharmaceutical drugs in the treatment of conditions such as high blood pressure, heart failure, diabetic nephropathy, and type 2 diabetes.

ACE inhibitors inhibit ACE competitively. That results in the decreased formation of angiotensin II and decreased metabolism of bradykinin, which leads to systematic dilation of the arteries and veins and a decrease in arterial blood pressure. In addition, inhibiting angiotensin II formation diminishes angiotensin II-mediated aldosterone secretion from the adrenal cortex, leading to a decrease in water and sodium reabsorption and a reduction in extracellular volume.

ACE's effect on Alzheimer's disease is still highly debated. Alzheimer patients usually show higher ACE levels in their brain. Some studies suggest that ACE inhibitors that are able to pass the blood-brain-barrier (BBB) could enhance the activity of major amyloid-beta peptide degrading enzymes like neprilysin in the brain resulting in a slower development of Alzheimer's disease. More recent research suggests that ACE inhibitors can reduce risk of Alzheimer's disease in the absence of apolipoprotein E4 alleles (ApoE4), but will have no effect in ApoE4- carriers. Another more recent hypothesis is that higher levels of ACE can prevent Alzheimer's. It is assumed that ACE can degrade beta-amyloid in brain blood vessels and therefore help prevent the progression of the disease.

A negative correlation between the ACE1 D-allele frequency and the prevalence and mortality of COVID-19 has been established.

== Pathology ==
- Elevated levels of ACE are also found in sarcoidosis, and are used in diagnosing and monitoring this disease. Elevated levels of ACE are also found in leprosy, hyperthyroidism, acute hepatitis, primary biliary cirrhosis, diabetes mellitus, multiple myeloma, osteoarthritis, amyloidosis, Gaucher disease, pneumoconiosis, histoplasmosis and miliary tuberculosis. It is also noted in some patients with extensive plaque psoriasis.
- Serum levels are decreased in renal disease, obstructive pulmonary disease, and hypothyroidism.

== Influence on athletic performance ==
The angiotensin converting enzyme gene has more than 160 polymorphisms described as of 2018.

Studies have shown that different genotypes of angiotensin converting enzyme can lead to varying influence on athletic performance. However, these data should be interpreted with caution due to the relatively small size of the investigated groups.

The rs1799752 I/D polymorphism (a.k.a. rs4340, rs13447447, rs4646994) consists of either an insertion (I) or deletion (D) of a 287 base pair sequence in intron 16 of the gene. The DD genotype is associated with higher plasma levels of the ACE protein, the DI genotype with intermediate levels, and II with lower levels. During physical exercise, due to higher levels of the ACE for D-allele carriers, hence higher capacity to produce angiotensin II, the blood pressure will increase sooner than for I-allele carriers. This results in a lower maximal heart rate and lower maximum oxygen uptake (VO_{2max}). Therefore, D-allele carriers have a 10% increased risk of cardiovascular diseases. Furthermore, the D-allele is associated with a greater increase in left ventricular growth in response to training compared to the I-allele. On the other hand, I-allele carriers usually show an increased maximal heart rate due to lower ACE levels, higher maximum oxygen uptake and therefore show an enhanced endurance performance. The I allele is found with increased frequency in elite distance runners, rowers and cyclists. Short distance swimmers show an increased frequency of the D-allele, since their discipline relies more on strength than endurance.

== History ==
The enzyme was reported by Leonard T. Skeggs Jr. in 1956. The crystal structure of human testis ACE was solved in the year 2002 by Ramanathan Natesh in the lab of K. Ravi Acharya in collaboration with Sylva Schwager and Edward Sturrock who purified the protein. It is located mainly in the capillaries of the lungs but can also be found in endothelial and kidney epithelial cells.

== Nomenclature ==
ACE is also known by the following names:

- dipeptidyl carboxypeptidase I
- peptidase P
- dipeptide hydrolase
- peptidyl dipeptidase
- angiotensin converting enzyme
- kininase II
- angiotensin I-converting enzyme
- carboxycathepsin
- dipeptidyl carboxypeptidase
- "hypertensin converting enzyme" peptidyl dipeptidase I
- peptidyl-dipeptide hydrolase
- peptidyldipeptide hydrolase
- endothelial cell peptidyl dipeptidase
- peptidyl dipeptidase-4
- PDH
- peptidyl dipeptide hydrolase
- DCP
- CD143

== See also ==
- ACE inhibitors
- Angiotensin-converting enzyme 2 (ACE2)
- Hypotensive transfusion reaction
- Renin–angiotensin system
