= Xaa-Pro aminopeptidase =

Class of enzymes

Identifiers
- EC no.: 3.4.11.9
- CAS no.: 37288-66-7

Databases
- IntEnz: IntEnz view
- BRENDA: BRENDA entry
- ExPASy: NiceZyme view
- KEGG: KEGG entry
- MetaCyc: metabolic pathway
- PRIAM: profile
- PDB structures: RCSB PDB PDBe PDBsum
Search
- PMC: articles
- PubMed: articles
- NCBI: proteins

Xaa-Pro aminopeptidase (EC 3.4.11.9, X-Pro aminopeptidase, proline aminopeptidase, aminopeptidase P, aminoacylproline aminopeptidase) is an enzyme. This enzyme catalyses the following chemical reaction

Release of any N-terminal amino acid, including proline, that is linked to proline, even from a dipeptide or tripeptide

This enzyme is Mn^{2+}-dependent.
