= Instituto Butantan =

Biotech research center in Brazil

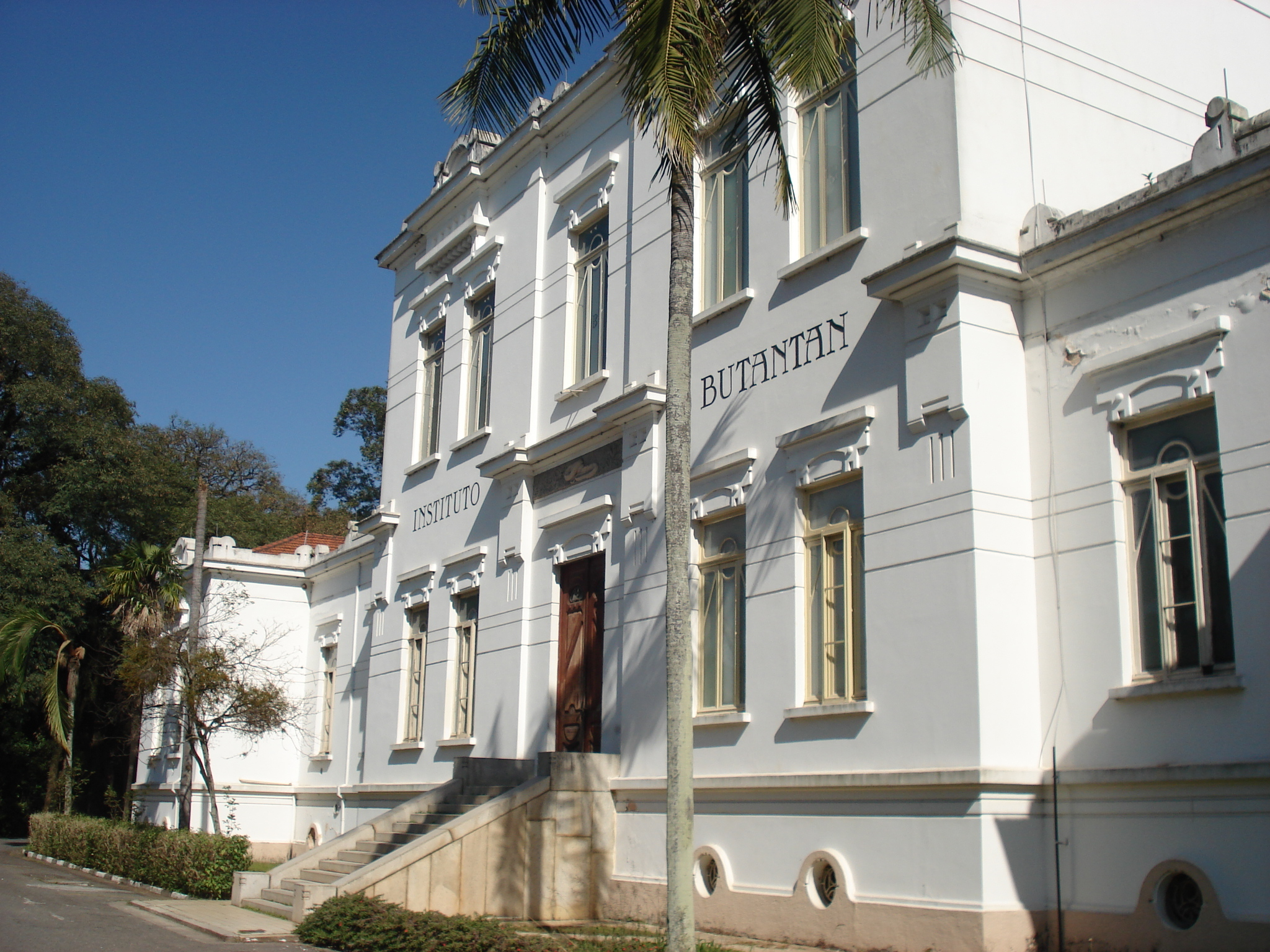
- Instituto Butantan
- Established: 23 February 1901
- Location: São Paulo, Brazil
- Website: Official website

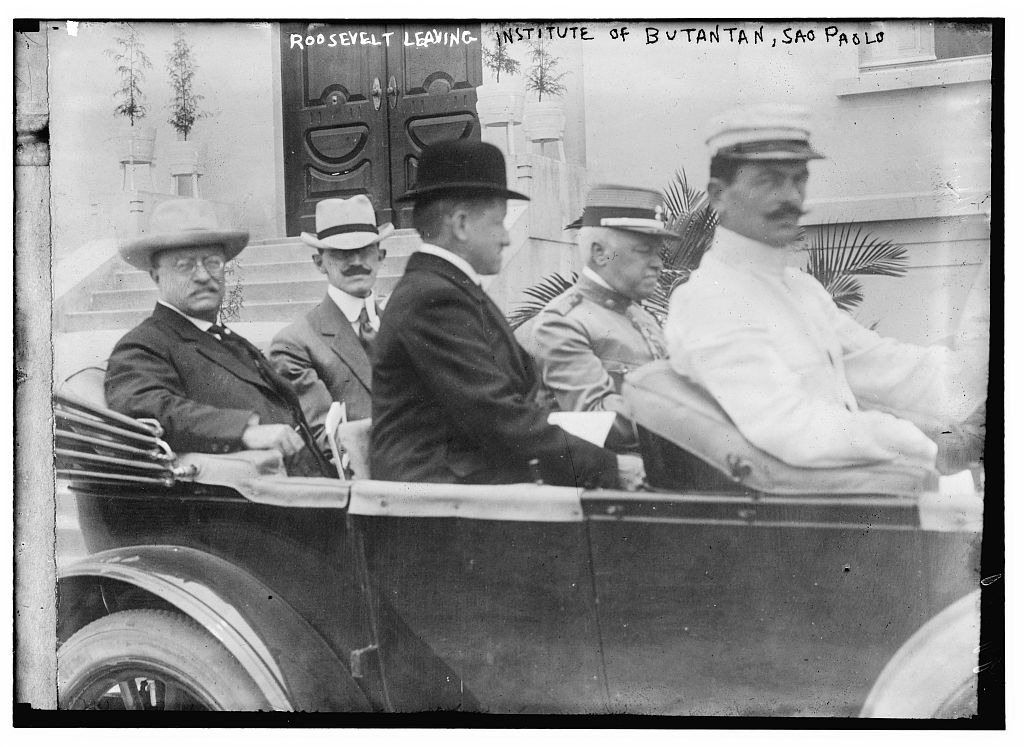
Theodore Roosevelt at the Instituto Butantan in 1914

The Instituto Butantan (pronounced [ĩstʃiˈtutu butɐ̃ˈtɐ̃]) is a Brazilian biologic research center located in Butantã, in the western part of the city of São Paulo, Brazil. Instituto Butantan is a public institution affiliated with the São Paulo State Secretariat of Health and considered one of the major scientific centers in the world. Butantan is the largest immunobiologicals and biopharmaceuticals producer in Latin America (and one of the largest in the world). It is known for its collection of venomous snakes, as well as those of venomous lizards, spiders, insects and scorpions. By extracting the reptiles' and insects' venoms, the Institute develops antivenoms and medicines against many diseases, which include tuberculosis, rabies, tetanus and diphtheria.

== History ==
The Instituto Butantan was founded by the Brazilian physician and biomedical scientist Vital Brazil on 23 February 1901, according to the Pasteur Institute paradigm, i.e., by combining in the same institution medical research, the transfer of the results to society as health products, and self-financing through this latter activity. Its foundation was a reaction to the outbreak of bubonic plague in the city of Santos. It is internationally renowned for its research on venomous animals; it was visited by Theodore Roosevelt in 1912. It is also a state-supported producer of vaccines against many infectious diseases, such as rabies, hepatitis, botulism, tetanus, diphtheria, pertussis and tuberculosis, as well as polyvalent and monovalent antivenoms against the bites of snakes, lizards, bees, scorpions and spiders (which, historically were first developed in the beginning of the 20th century by Dr. Vital Brazil and his coworkers). Among the distinguished scientists at the institute were biochemists Karl Slotta and Heinz Fraenkel-Conrat, pioneers in the study of progesterone, estriol, and medical use of venom, from 1935 to 1948.

A fire in 2010 destroyed the collection facility, which maintained one of the largest collections of venomous animals in the world, comprising around 80,000 snake specimens, and an estimated 450,000 spiders and scorpions.

The name of the institute comes from "Butantã", a district in the west zone of São Paulo. "Butantã" itself is a Tupi word meaning "crushed soil".

== Education and research ==
The Butantan develops basic and applied biomedical research in many areas, including molecular biology, immunology and epidemiology and has a graduate research training program in collaboration with other institutions, in the areas of biotechnology and infectology. Besides its research laboratories, production units and specialized library, it operates an animal breeding center for providing subjects for research and production of sera. The Instituto Butantan also operate the "Hospital Vital Brazil", a specialist hospital that offers free treatment for poisonous animal stings and bites. The institute also accepts donations of serpents, arthropods and other animals captured by the public and by a network of collaborating centers and individuals.

The following research laboratories are part of the Butantan Institute:

- Arthropods
- Herpetology
- Cellular biology
- Immunogenetics
- Immunopathology
- Viral Immunology
- Immunochemistry
- Genetics
- Dermatology
- Pathophysiology
- Biochemistry and Biophysics
- Pharmacology
- Microbiology
- Parasitology
- Biopharmaceuticals
- Applied Toxinology
- Biotechnology Center

Important Brazilian scientists who have worked in the Butantan Institute are: Vital Brazil, Afrânio Pompílio Gastos do Amaral, Isaias Raw, Samuel Pessoa, Willy Beçak. The Institute has strong collaborative ties with the Pasteur Institute, Paris, France, and with the Oswaldo Cruz Foundation, Rio de Janeiro.

== Production ==
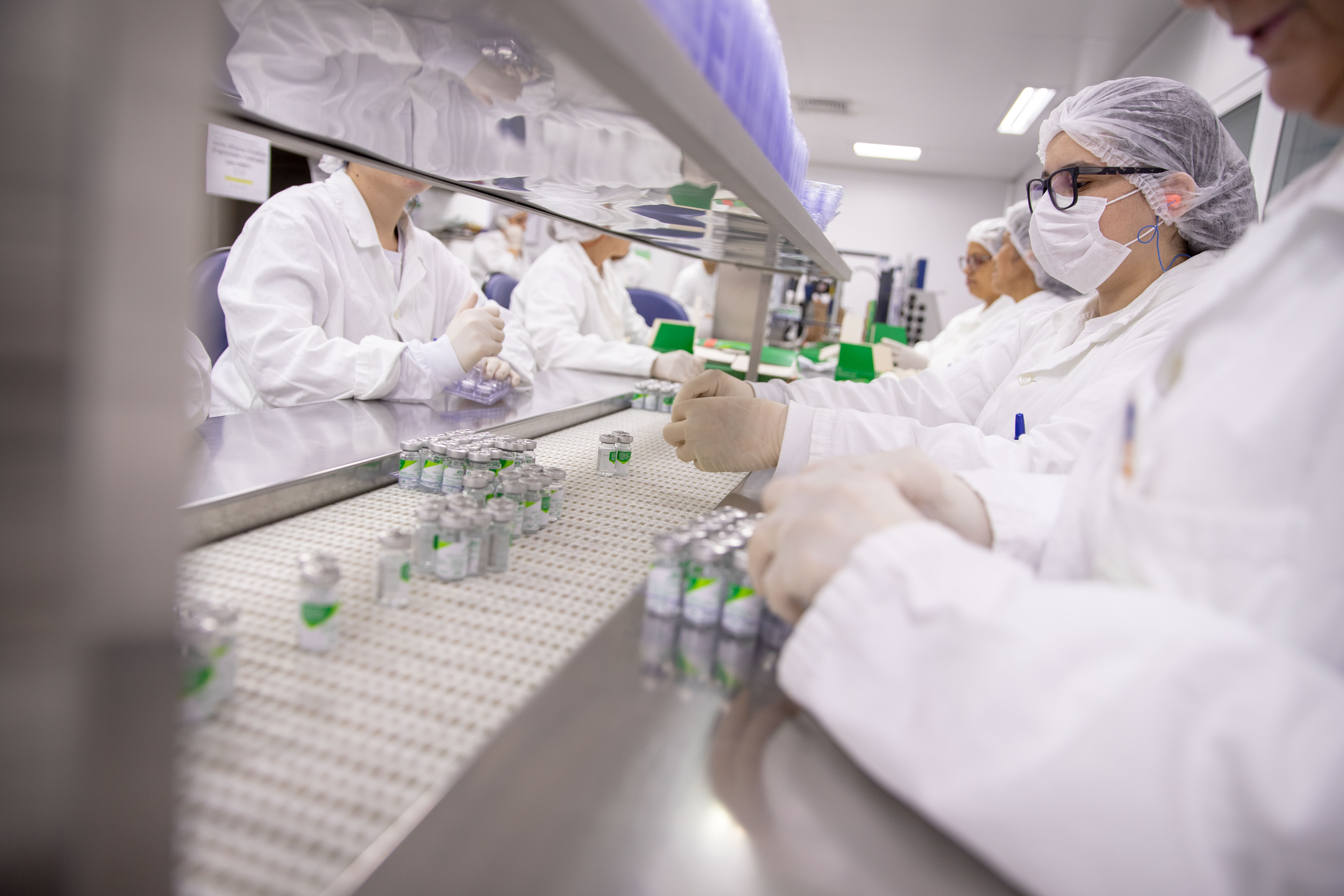
Influenza vaccines being packaged at Instituto Butantan in March 2019

The Butantan is the largest producer in Latin America (and one of the largest in the world) of immunobiologicals and biopharmaceuticals. In 2001 it produced ca. 110 million doses of vaccines and 300 thousand vials of hyperimmune sera. The institute is responsible for the production of 90% of the vaccines used in Brazil. The institute contains a venom farm where researchers milk around a thousand snakes for their venom which is used to make antivenoms and for medical research.

The production units manufacture the following bioproducts:

=== Hyperimmune sera and antivenoms ===
- Anti-Bothropic
- Anti-Crotalic
- Anti-Bothropic-Crotalic
- Anti-Elapidic
- Anti-Bothropic-Lachetic
- Anti-Escorpionic
- Anti-Arachnidic
- Anti-Lonomia
- Anti-Africanized Bee
- Anti-Diphtheric
- Anti-Tetanic
- Anti-Botulinic A, B, E
- Anti-Rabies
- Anti-Human Thymocytes

=== Vaccines ===
- Tetanus Toxoid
- Diphtheria-tetanus vaccine (Pediatric and adult)
- Triple vaccine: Diphtheria-Tetanus-Pertussis
- Recombinant Hepatitis B
- BCG (intradermic)
- Rabies (Vero Cell culture)
- CoronaVac (COVID-19)

=== Biopharmaceuticals ===
- Botulin toxin
- BCG (intravesical)
- Monoclonal antibody: Anti-CD3
- Erythropoietin
- Pulmonary surfactant

== Public activities ==
The Butantan is one of the major touristic and educational attractions in a vast park area in the city section of Butantã in São Paulo. It has a serpentarium, a historical museum, a biological museum, and a museum of microbiology. The venom farm is a major attraction and visitors can see the snakes housed in representations of their natural environments. The park also contains rare tree types.

== Butantan Foundation ==
The Fundação Butantan is a non-profit corporation established in 1984 by Prof. Willy Beçak to use more efficiently public funds and capital investments made by the Ministry of Health for the production of immunobiologicals. The Foundation reinvests part of the proceeds to build new facilities for new products. Part of the funds are used in the Institute for research and cultural activities, as well as to provide its workers with meals and basic food supplies.

== 2010 fire ==
On 15 May 2010, a fire almost burned down the laboratory and destroyed the institute's entire collection of snake specimens (approximately 85,000 specimens preserved with formaldehyde and stored in 70% ethanol) and ca. 450,000–500,000 specimens of scorpions and spiders (also stored in ethanol). It was one of the largest collections of snakes in the world. Over 90 years of research were lost.

The fire started at 7:08 BRT (10:08 GMT) and was brought under control by a crew of 50 firemen an hour and a half later. News reports have claimed that the facility was not prepared for a fire, not having a fire alarm or sprinkler system. Police are investigating the fire which has been described by curator Francisco Luís Franco as "a loss for humanity". None of the live animals or people at the institute were harmed by the fire.

== See also ==
- Science and Technology in Brazil
- National Museum of Brazil fire

== Bibliography ==
- Benchimol, Jaime Larry; Teixeira, Luiz Antônio (1993). Cobras, lagartos e outros bichos: uma história comparada dos Institutos Oswaldo Cruz e Butantan. Rio de Janeiro: Editora UFRJ.
- Perleth, Matthias (1997). Historical Aspects of American Trypanosomiasis. New York: Peter Lang. ISBN 3-631-31063-3.
- Escobar, Herton (2010-05-18). "Sem sistema de combate a incêndio, museus de zoologia correm riscos". Estadão (in Portuguese). p. A17.
- "Instituto Butantan". State Government of São Paulo. Archived from the original on 2010-09-20.
