= Helena Nader =

Brazilian biomedical scientist

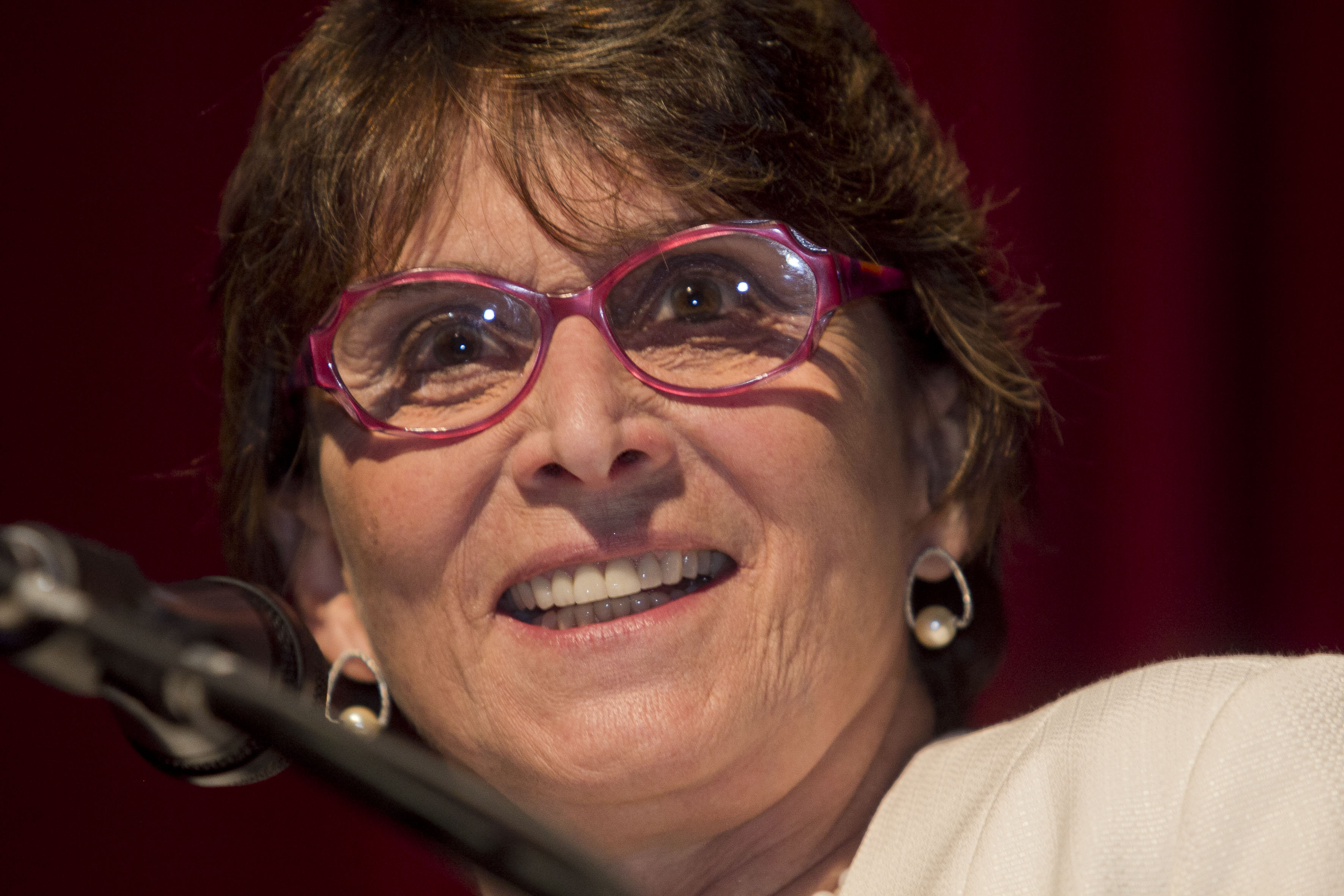
- Education: Federal University of São Paulo; University of São Paulo
- Scientific career
- Workplaces: Federal University of São Paulo; University of Southern California
- Thesis: Heparithm sulfates. Isolation, characterization, properties and alterations in pathological conditions (mucopolysaccharidoses) (1974)

Helena Bonciani Nader (born November 5, 1947) is a Brazilian biomedical scientist based at the Federal University of São Paulo. She served as president of the Brazilian Society for the Advancement of Science from 2011 to 2017. She works in glycobiology, specialising in the characterisation of proteoglycans. She is a member of The World Academy of Sciences.

== Early life and education ==
Nader was born in São Paulo, to a family of Syrian, Lebanese and Italian descent. She spent her childhood in São Paulo and Curitiba. She was a high school student in the United States. She studied biomedical sciences at the Federal University of São Paulo and graduated with a bachelor's degree in 1970. She simultaneously earned a bachelor's degree in education at the University of São Paulo, before beginning her doctoral studies in molecular biology. She was supervised by Carl Von Peter Dietrich. Nader earned a doctorate at the Federal University of São Paulo in 1974. She was a postdoctoral researcher at the University of Southern California.

== Research and career ==
Nader returned to the Federal University of São Paulo, where she was made a professor in 1989. Nader studies glycobiology, investigating proteoglycans, a complex class of glycoconjugates. She studies how proteoglycans such as heparan sulfate are involved in hemostasis. Her work involves nuclear magnetic resonance spectroscopy and fragment analysis. She holds visiting professorships at Loyola University Medical Center and The W. Alton Jones Cell Science Center.

Nader is an advocate for equality, diversity and inclusion in science and engineering. She has been a member of the Brazilian Society for the Advancement of Science since 1969, and took part in resistance to the military dictatorship. She was appointed president of the Brazilian Society for the Advancement of Science in 2011. She was the third woman to hold the position, after Carolina Bori and Glaci Zancan. She held the position for three terms, handing over the position in 2017. During her time as president, she encouraged the allocation of oil royalties to science and technology.

On March 29, 2022, she was elected president of the Brazilian Academy of Sciences.

== Awards and honours ==
- 2002 Class Commander of the National Order of Scientific Merit
- 2005 Honorary Professorship at the Federal University of Rio de Janeiro
- 2008 Grand Cross Class of the National Order of Scientific Merit
- 2009 President of the Brazilian Society of Biochemistry and Molecular Biology
- 2010 Moacyr Álvaro Gold Medal
- 2011-2017 President of the Brazilian Society for the Advancement of Science
- 2013 Brazilian Navy Merit Medal Tamandaré
- 2016 Nuclear National Energy Commission, Felippe Sheep Medal
- 2018 Brazilian Society of Cell Biology, Classics in Cell Biology
- 2018 Federation of Experimental Biology Societies, Science Service Award
- 2020 Prêmio Almirante Álvaro Alberto, CNPq

== Books ==
- 2015 Sulfated Polysaccharides (Biochemistry and Molecular Biology in the Post Genomic Era)
