= José Reis =

José Reis may refer to:

- José Reis (footballer) (born 1911), former Portuguese footballer
- José Reis (kickboxer) (born 1977), Portuguese Muay Thai kickboxer
- José Reis (politician), East Timorese politician
- José Reis (scientist) (1907–2002), Brazilian scientist, journalist and science writer
