= José Reis (scientist) =

Brazilian scientist (1907–2002)

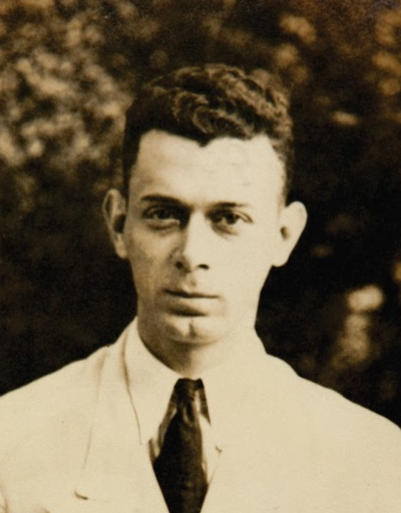
José Reis

José Reis (June 12, 1907 – May 16, 2002) was a Brazilian scientist, journalist, scientific leader and science writer.

Reis was born in Rio de Janeiro, the eleventh of thirteen children. He attended secondary school at Colégio D. Pedro II, and, on leaving school in 1924, was awarded the "Pantheon" prize, conferred on the best students of Colégio D. Pedro II. He went on to study medicine at the University of Brazil's National Faculty of Medicine (presently Federal University of Rio de Janeiro) from 1925. During his medical course, he studied pathology at the Instituto Oswaldo Cruz. After graduation, he worked from 1928 to 1929 at the Institute as a bacteriologist, having decided to specialize in scientific research in virology. For his achievements there, he received the Oswaldo Cruz Medal. As a result, he accepted an invitation to move to São Paulo in the next year and work at the Biological Institute, an applied research center set up by the state government, in the section of bacteriology. Later, he studied at the Rockefeller Institute in New York City, United States, from 1935 to 1936.

Returning to Brazil, Dr. Reis resumed his work at the Biological Institute. Under the instigation of the Institute's director, the German biologist Hermann von Ihering, to study a mysterious viral disease afflicting chicken producers in the state, he became gradually a renowned world expert on ornithopathology (avian diseases) and eventually was nominated director of the Institute. He felt also the urge to write pamphlets and booklets in a simple language, in order to instruct the agriculturists of the state on how to prevent and fight this and other diseases, and soon started to contribute regularly to a specialized magazine in this field, "Chácaras & Quintais".

In 1947, Dr. José Reis, who now displayed a marvelous talent for explaining scientific concepts for laypeople, started a parallel career as a journalist, first by writing a science column at one of the town's two most important newspapers, the Folha de S.Paulo. He maintained this column for the next 55 years, until shortly before his death, probably a world record for a science newspaper columnist. The column was syndicated to many other newspapers. He also dabbed in general journalism, and became one of the editors-in-chief at the Folha from 1962 to 1968, during the critical years of the military régime which was installed in April 1964 in Brazil. He also taught at the Faculty of Economy and Administration of the University of São Paulo and at Mackenzie Presbyterian University.

As a scientific leader, Reis was exceedingly important for the history of Brazilian science and technology, as one of the founders of the Brazilian Society for the Advancement of Science (SBPC), in 1949, together with other important scientific personalities of the country, such as Jorge Americano, Paulo Sawaya, Maurício Rocha e Silva, Gastão Rosenfeld, Wilson Teixeira Beraldo, José Ribeiro do Vale and others . He was also the founder and the editor-in-chief for almost his entire life of "Ciência e Cultura", SBPC's official journal.

Reis received many national and international prizes, awards and honours, such as the Jonh R. Reitermeyer Award, granted by the Inter-American Press Society and the Panamerican Press Union in 1964; and the prestigious Kalinga Prize for the Popularization of Science by UNESCO (United Nations Organization for Education, Science and Culture). In his honour, the Brazilian National Research Council (CNPq) instituted in 1978 the José Reis Science Communication Award. His name is honoured also in the Núcleo José Reis de Divulgação Científica, a research and education centre at the School of Communication and Arts of the University of São Paulo.

Reis continued his work at Folha de S.Paulo until his death in São Paulo; he died of complications of multiple pneumonia in 2002, at 94 years of age. His latest work, Ética e Divulgação Científica: Os Desafios do Novo Século (Ethic and Cientific Divulgation: The Challenges of the New Century), fifth in the Science Popularization Series, was published in the same year.

== Timeline ==
1935/36: Professor Thomas M. invites him for an internship at the Rockefeller Institute, In the United States.

1936: Publishes the book Tratado de Ornipatologia (Treatise of Ornithopathology - bird diseases), in collaboration with Paulo Nóbrega and Annita Swenson Reis

1941: J. Reis participates in the reorganization of the (Brazilian) Department of Agriculture; the book Rasgando Horizontes (Tearing Horizons), with C.B.Schmidt, resulted from this work.

1943: Interventor (a temporary governor indicated by the President) Fernando Costa invites him to direct the Department of Public Service of the State of São Paulo (Departamento de Serviço Público do Estado de São Paulo).

1947: April 6: Begins to write for Folha da Manhã (Morning Paper), Folha da Noite (Evening Paper) and Folha de S.Paulo (São Paulo Paper) newspapers. In the beginning his writings concerned administrative matters, but later they regularly started to deal only with Science, continuing until he died in 2002, 55 years later.

1948: July 8: J. Reis participates in the foundation of the Brazilian Society for the Progress of Science (Sociedade Brasileira para o progresso da Ciência) - SBPC "(...) under my initiative, for this purpose I gathered, initially, doctors Paulo Sawaya, Maurício Rocha e Silva and Gastão Rosenfeld, the Brazilian Society for the Progress of Science was founded, and I was its first secretary-general and which magazine Ciência e Cultura (Science and Culture) I currently direct, without compensation." Folha de S.Paulo starts his Sunday column The World of Science (No mundo da Ciência).

1949: Founds and becomes editor of Ciência e Cultura (Science and Culture) magazine.

1950: Becomes a professional journalist.

1954: First phase as editor of SBPC's "Ciência e Cultura" magazine ends.

1955: Becomes member of the Permanent Commission of the Integral Regime, until the advent of governor Adhemar de Barros's administration. Begins to collaborate with Anhembi (pronounced ain-am-bee) Magazine, with his column "Ciência de 30 dias" (Science in the Past 30 Days).

1956: Participates as relator on science teaching themes at the annual meeting of the Brazilian Education Association (Associação Brasileira de Educação), in Salvador, Bahia.

1957: The second edition of his book Treatise of Ornithopathology is released.

1958: Retires from the Biological Institute (Portuguese: Instituto Biológico), receiving the title of Emeritus Servant. Founds, with José Nabantino Ramos and Clóvis Queiroga, Editora IBRASA (IBRASA publishing house) -where he launches "ferment-books", "which bring new ideas and bring about debate"; his performance as editor endures for 20 years, until 1978.

1962: Assumes the post of Editing Director of Folha de S.Paulo newspaper, "responsible for the orientation and writing of editorials, without compromising the science popularization work" (1962–67). Receives the Governador do Estado de SP (Governor of the State of São Paulo) Science Journalism Prize.

1963: In a UN meeting about Science and Technology in Geneva, he presents a report on science attitude in teaching.

1964: Awarded with the John R. Reitemeyer Prize in science journalism, conferred for the first time by the Inter-American Press Society (Sociedade Interamericana de Imprensa) and by the Panamerican Press Union (UniãoPanamericana de Imprensa).

1967: Leaves the post of Editing Director at Folha de S. Paulo.

1968: Publishes the book Educação é Investimento (Education is Investment), with preface by Alceu Amoroso Lima, from Editora IBRASA.

1972: Returns to the position of director of SBPC's Ciência e Cultura magazine .

1975: Awarded with UNESCO' Kalinga Prize.

1978: The José Reis Prize for Science Communication is established by the National Council of Scientific and Technological Development, CNPq.

1986: Ends his activities at Ciência e Cultura magazine, for which he was responsible from 1949 to 1954 and from 1972 to 1985.

1992: The José Reis Center for the Popularization of Science (JRC) of the School of Communications and Arts at the University of São Paulo is founded.

1997: A committee headed by Prof.. Dr. Crodowaldo Pavan, composed of members of the JRC, School of Communications and Arts, FAPESP and CNPq, celebrates on the 12th of June the ninetieth anniversary of José Reis.

1998: On the 8th of July the first book of the Science Popularization Series, A Espiral em Busca do Infinito (The Spiral Toward Infinity) is released, honoring José Reis. It was created by the JRC team, under the supervision of Glória Kreinz and Crodowaldo Pavan.

1999: José Reis continues to act as a journalist at Folha de S.Paulo, with his column Periscópio (Periscope), Idealistas Isolados (Isolated Idealists), the second book of the Science Popularization Series was published.

2000: A text by José Reis, titled Fundação de Amparo à Pesquisa (Research Fostering Foundation), was published in the book Os Donos da Paisagem (The Landscape Owners), third in the Science Popularization Series was published.

2001: José Reis is elected honorary president of the recently founded Brazilian Association of Science Popularization, ABRADIC, and José Reis: Jornalista, Cientista e Divulgador Científico (José Reis: Journalist, Cientist and Cientific Divugator), fourth in the Science Popularization Series was published.

After death:

2003: Divulgação Científica: Refexões (Cientific Divulgation: Refexions), sixth in the Science Popularization Series was published.

2004: Congresso Internacional de Divulgação Científica (International Congress of Science Divulgation), seventh in the Science Popularization Series was published.

2005: José Reis: Ciência, Poesia e Outros Caminhos (José Reis: Science, Poetry and Others), eighth in the Science Popularization Series was published.

2006: Círculos Crescentes (Crescent Circles), ninth in the Science Popularization Series was published.

== Quote ==
"Science is beautiful and deeply esthetic; therefore we should exhibit it to society" (A ciência é bonita e profundamente estética; portanto, devemos exibi-la à sociedade)
