= Carolina Bori =

Brazilian psychologist

Carolina Martuscelli Bori
- Born: 4 January 1924; São Paulo, São Paulo, Brazil
- Died: 4 October 2004 (aged 80); São Paulo, São Paulo, Brazil
- Occupation: psychologist
- Employer: University of São Paulo

Academic background
- Education: University of São Paulo (undergraduate and doctorate)
- Alma mater: University of São Paulo
- Thesis: 'Task Interruption Experiments and Kurt Lewin's Motivation Theory' (1954)
- Doctoral advisor: Annita de Castilho e Marcondes Cabral

Carolina Martuscelli Bori (January 4, 1924—October 4, 2004) was a Brazilian psychologist, specialized in experimental psychology. She was instrumental in establishing psychology undergraduate courses in Brazilian universities, as well as regularizing standards for the profession in the country. Bori was president of the Brazilian Society for the Advancement of Science (SBPC) from 1986 to 1989.

== Graduation ==
Bori was born in São Paulo. She graduated in Pedagogy from the University of São Paulo (USP) in 1947. She also specialized in Educational Psychology from USP in 1948. She completed her master's degree in 1952 at the New School for Social Research (NSSR), New York, United States. She received a doctorate in psychology from USP in 1954, supervised by Annita de Castilho and Marcondes Cabral, with the thesis Experiments on Interruption of Tasks and the Theory of Motivation by Kurt Lewin.

== Works ==
=== Periodical articles ===
- Bori, C. M (1953). O papel do experimentador e do sujeito na situação experimental. Boletim de Psicologia, 5, 9-17.
- Bori, C. M. (1954). Um curso de estatística aplicada à experimentação psicológica. Ciência e Cultura, 18, 19, 20, 18 – 21.
- Bori, C. M. (1956). Como o laboratório de psicologia estuda an expressão da personalidade. Boletim de Psicologia, 25, 26 e 27, 7-26.
- Bori, C. M., (1964). Aparelhos e o laboratório de psicologia. Jornal Brasileiro de Psicologia, 1(1), 61–65.
- BORI, C. M.; ZANNON, C. M. L. C. SBP, 1972: relato do Plano Brasília por Fed S. Keller. Psicologia: Teoria e Pesquisa, São Paulo, v. 12, n.3, p. 191-192, 1996.
- BORI, C. M.; TODOROV, J. C.; SOUZA, D. G. Momentary maximizing in concurrent schedules with a minimum interchangeover interval. Journal of the Experimental Analysis of Behavior, Bloomington, v. 60, n.2, p. 415-435, 1993.
- BORI, C. M. . SBPC, ciência e tecnologia. Ciência e Cultura, São Paulo, v. 41, n.3, p. 211, 1989.
- BORI, C. M.; DIAS, T. R. S. Proposta de um procedimento para identificar funções relativas de eventos quantitativamente differentes. Ciência e Cultura, São Paulo, v. 39, n.7 supl., p. 892, 1987.
- Martuscelli, C. (1950). Uma pesquisa sobre aceitação de grupos nacionais, raciais e regionais em São Paulo. Boletim CXIX, Psicologia, 3. São Paulo: Universidade de São Paulo, Faculdade de Filosofia, Ciências e Letras.
- Martuscelli, C. (1955). Desenho no estudo da personalidade: a prova de desenho da figura humana. Boletim de Psicologia, 21, 22, 23 e 24, 59–62.
- Martuscelli, C. Estudo psicológico do grupo. In: Queiroz, M. I. P., Castaldi, C., Ribeiro, E. T., Martuscelli, C. (1957) Estudos de sociologia e história. São Paulo: Ed. Anhembi, pp. 84–125.
- Martuscelli, C. (1958). Percepção e arte. Boletim de Psicologia, 35 e 36, 101.
- Martuscelli, C. (1959). Experimentos de interrupção de tarefas e a teoria de motivação de Kurt Lewin. Tese doutorado. Universidade de São Paulo, SP.

=== Books ===
- BORI, C. M. Famílias de categorias baixa e média de status social de centros urbanos: caracterização das relações formais e informais dos membros e dos papel social dos cônjuges. São Paulo:, 1969. 158p .
- BORI, C. M. Experimentos de interrupção de tarefa e a teoria de motivação de Kurt Lewin. São Paulo:, 1959. 174p

== Legacy ==
Agência Bori: a platform created in 2020 to promote Brazilian scientific research to the press. Its name is a tribute to the first woman to preside over the Brazilian Society for the Advancement of Science (SBPC).

Carolina Bori Platform: the official system for the revalidation of foreign university degrees in Brazil is named in honor of Carolina Bori.
