= Renato Janine Ribeiro =

Brazilian professor and education minister (born 1949)

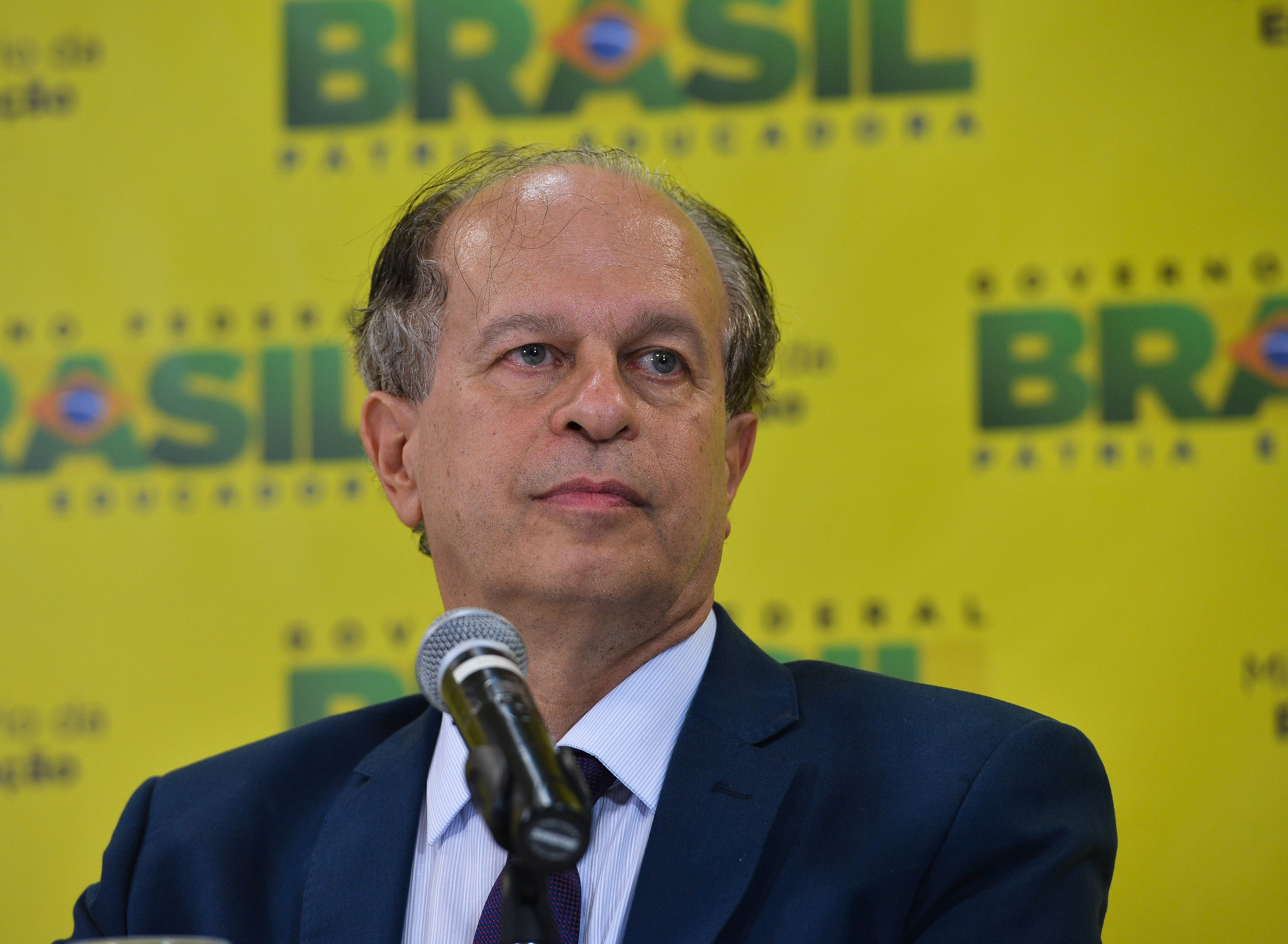

President of Brazilian Society for the Progress of Science
- Incumbent
- Assumed office July 23, 2021
- Preceded by: Ildeu Moreira

Minister of Education
- In office April 6, 2015 – September 30, 2015
- President: Dilma Rousseff
- Preceded by: Cid Gomes
- Succeeded by: Aloizio Mercadante

Personal details
- Born: December 9, 1949 (age 76) Araraquara, São Paulo
- Education: University of São Paulo (BPhil, PhD); University of Paris (MPhil)

Renato Janine Ribeiro is a Brazilian full professor of ethics and political philosophy at the University of São Paulo. As of April 6, 2015, he was named Minister of Education of Brazil in the cabinet of Dilma Rousseff.

Political offices
Preceded by Cid Gomes	Minister of Education; 2015	Succeeded by Aloizio Mercadante
Non-profit organization positions
Preceded by Ildeu Moreira	President of Brazilian Society for the Progress of Science; 2021–present	Incumbent
