= Ciência sem Fronteiras =

Ciência sem Fronteiras (Science Without Borders) was a research and exchange program established on July 26, 2011, by the Brazilian federal government to encourage scholarships for scientific projects abroad.

The main objective of the program is to distribute scholarships for students of all levels in STEM related majors for international exchange programs. The goal of the Brazilian federal government in funding the program is to attract scientists from other countries to Brazil in order to stimulate research and innovation in Brazilian science and technology (S&T).

The program aims to provide 101,000 scholarships by 2015.

== See also ==
- Brazilian science and technology
