= Ministry of Science, Technology and Innovation (Brazil) =

Brazilian government science and technology ministry

- Portuguese: Ministério da Ciência, Tecnologia e Inovação (MCTIC)

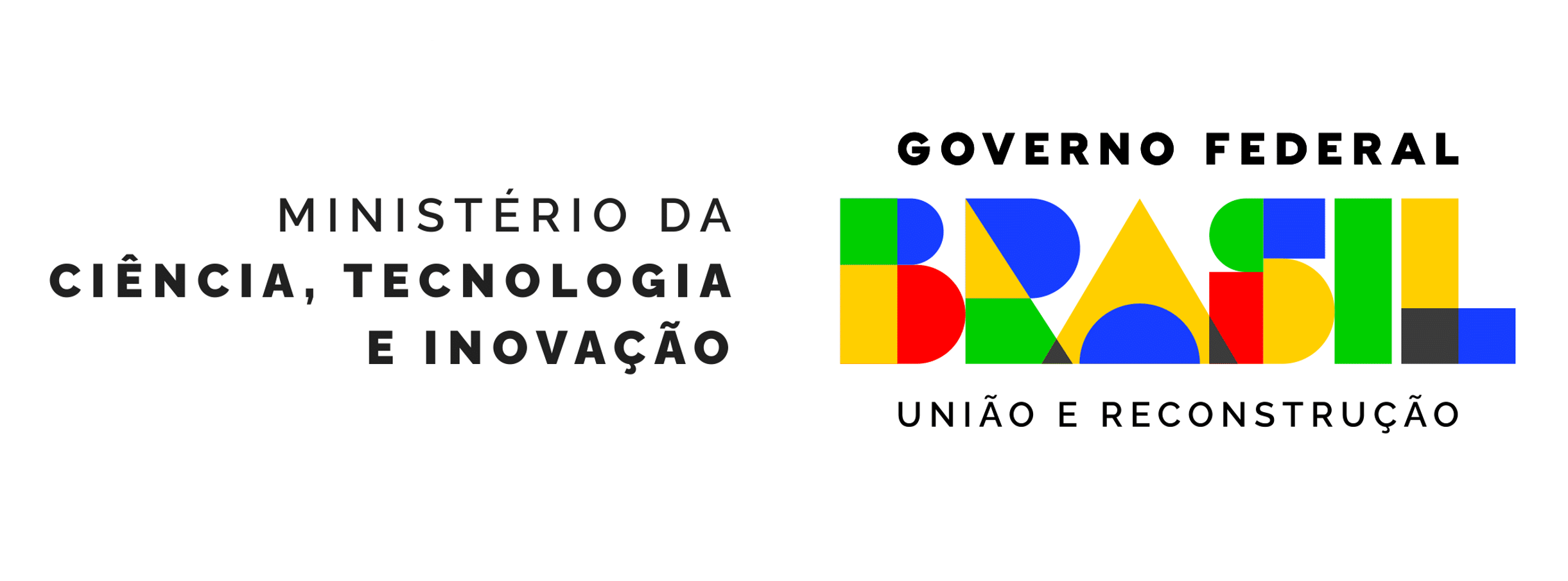

Agency overview
- Formed: 15 March 1985; 41 years ago
- Type: Ministry
- Jurisdiction: Federal government of Brazil
- Headquarters: Esplanada dos Ministérios, Bloco E Brasília, Federal District
- Annual budget: $13.32 b BRL (2023)
- Agency executives: Luciana Santos, Minister; Luis Rebelo Fernandes, Executive-Secretary; Marcia Cristina Barbosa, Secretary of Policies and Strategic Programs; Inácio Arruda, Secretary of Science and Technology for Social Development; Guila Calheiros, Secretary of Technological Development and Innovation; Henrique de Oliveira Miguel, Secretary of Science and Technology for Digital Transformation
- Website: www.gov.br/mcti/

The Ministry of Science, Technology and Innovation (MCTI; Portuguese: Ministério da Ciência, Tecnologia e Inovação) of Brazil is the civilian cabinet organization, which coordinates science, technology, and innovation activities in the country. It is headed by the Minister of Science, Technology and Innovation.

== Agencies under the MCTI ==
- Brazilian Innovation Agency (FINEP)
- National Council for Scientific and Technological Development (CNPq)
- National Nuclear Energy Commission (CNEN)
- Brazilian Center for Physics Research (CBPF)
- National Institute for Space Research (INPE)
- Brazilian Space Agency (AEB)
- Brazilian National Laboratory of Scientific Computation (LNCC)
- Brazilian National Institute of Pure and Applied Mathematics (IMPA)
- Brazilian National Laboratory of Synchrotron Light
- Renato Archer Research Center (CTI)

== Gallery ==
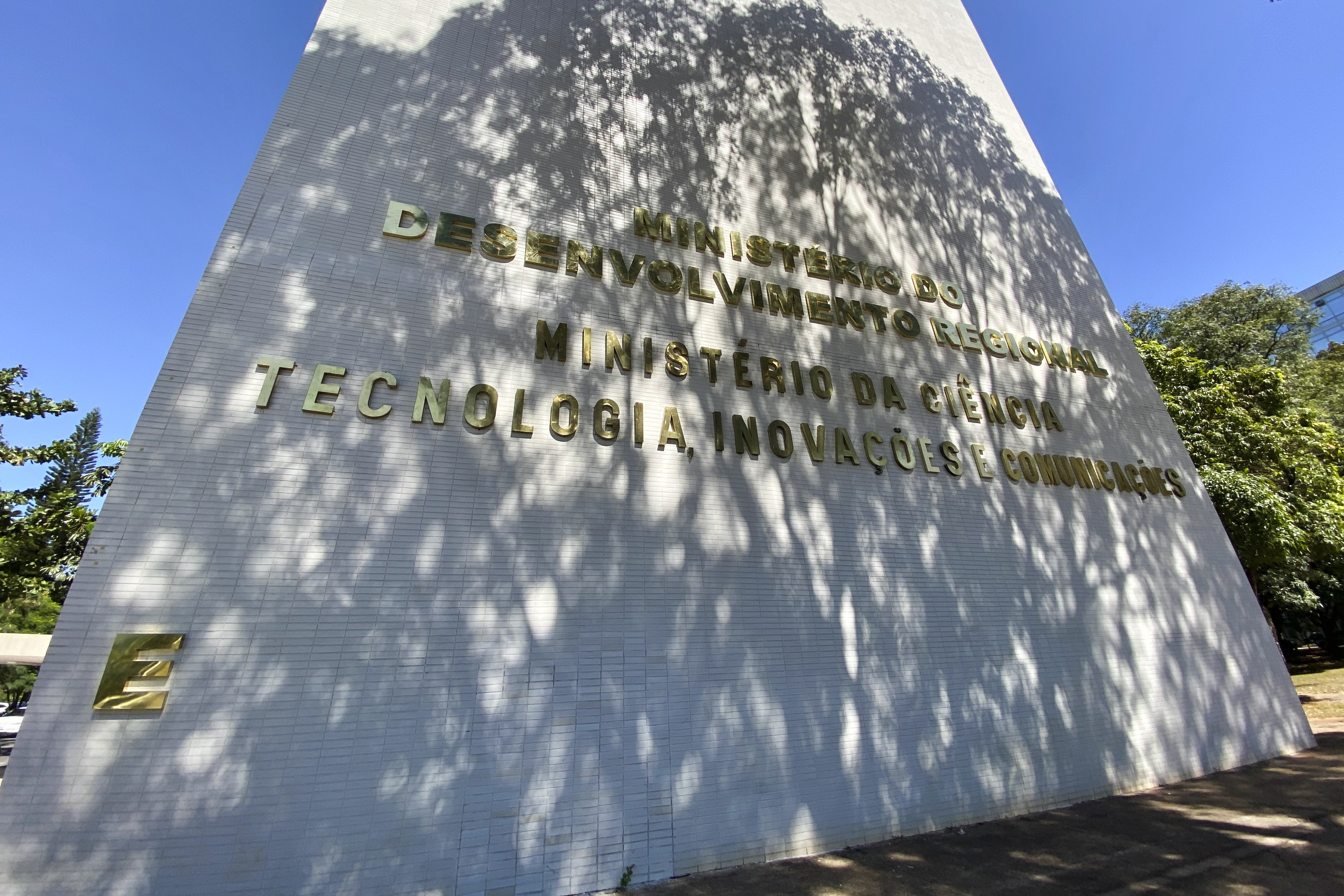
Ministry sign on Esplanada dos Ministérios

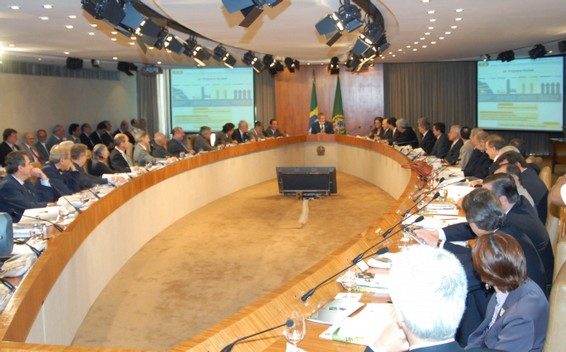
National Council for Scientific and Technological Development meeting

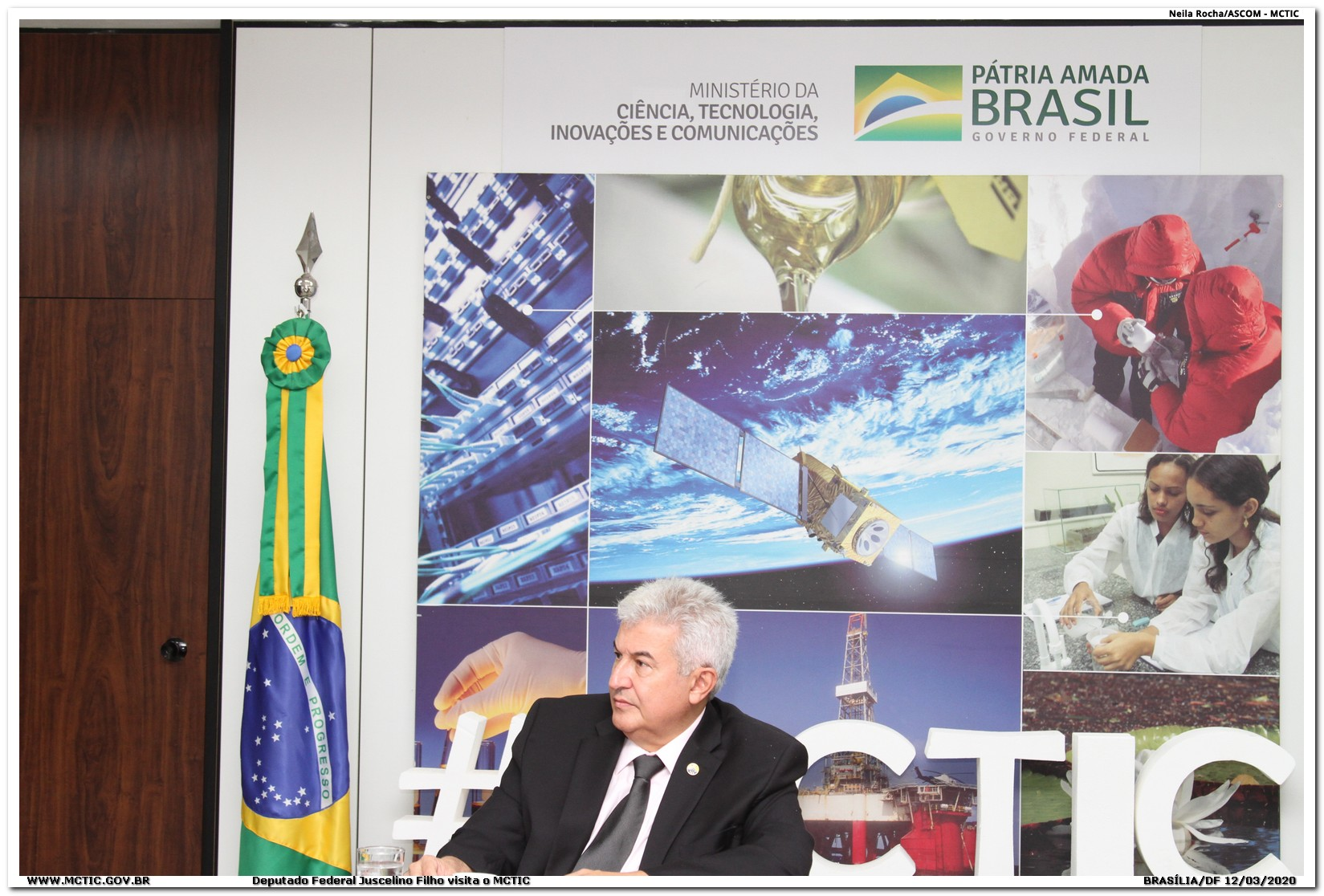
Federal Deputy Juscelino Filho visit to the Ministry of Science, Technology, Innovation and Communications

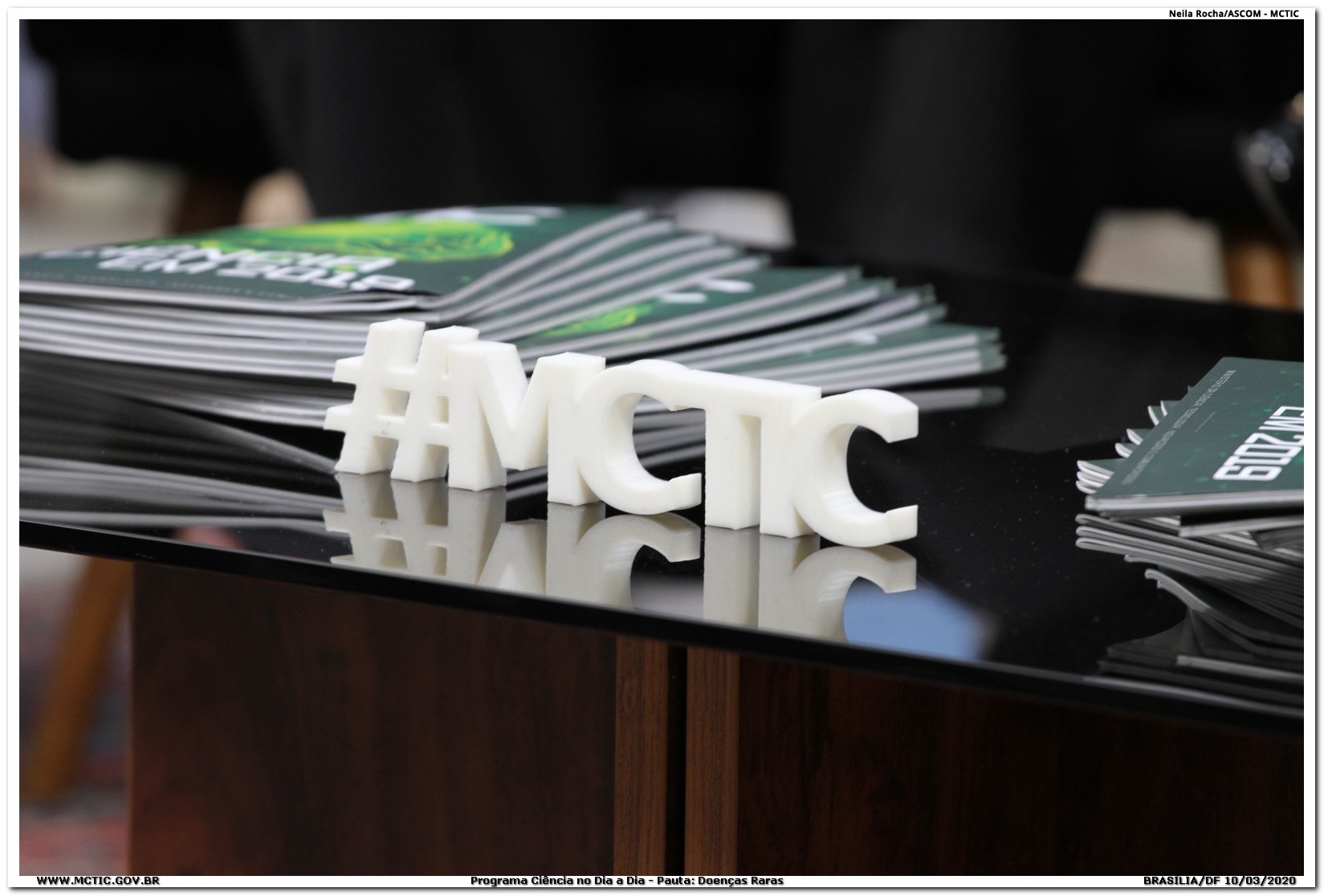
#MCTIC hashtag

== List of ministers ==
No.	Portrait	Minister	Took office	Left office	Time in office	Party	President
1	Renato Archer	Renato Archer (1922–1996)	15 March 1985	22 October 1987	2 years, 221 days	MDB	José Sarney (MDB)
2	Luiz Henrique da Silveira	Luiz Henrique da Silveira (1940–2015)	22 October 1987	29 July 1988	281 days	MDB	José Sarney (MDB)
3	Luiz André Rico Vicente	Luiz André Rico Vicente (born 1947)	29 July 1988	16 August 1988	18 days	Independent	José Sarney (MDB)
4	Ralph Biasi	Ralph Biasi (1947–2017)	16 August 1988	15 January 1989	152 days	MDB	José Sarney (MDB)
5	Roberto Cardoso Alves	Roberto Cardoso Alves (1927–1996)	15 January 1989	13 March 1989	57 days	PTB	José Sarney (MDB)
6	Décio Leal	Décio Leal (1940–1996)	13 March 1989	15 March 1990	1 year, 2 days	Independent	José Sarney (MDB)
7	José Goldemberg	José Goldemberg (born 1928)	15 March 1990	21 August 1991	1 year, 159 days	Independent	Fernando Collor (PRN)
8	Edson Machado de Sousa	Edson Machado de Sousa (1940–2018)	21 August 1991	1 April 1992	224 days	Independent	Fernando Collor (PRN)
9	Hélio Jaguaribe	Hélio Jaguaribe (1923–2018)	1 April 1992	1 October 1992	183 days	PSDB	Fernando Collor (PRN)
10	José Israel Vargas	José Israel Vargas (1928–2025)	27 October 1992	1 January 1999	6 years, 66 days	Independent	Itamar Franco (MDB); Fernando Henrique Cardoso (PSDB)
11	Luiz Carlos Bresser-Pereira	Luiz Carlos Bresser-Pereira (born 1934)	1 January 1999	21 July 1999	201 days	Independent	Fernando Henrique Cardoso (PSDB)
12	Ronaldo Sardenberg	Ronaldo Sardenberg (born 1940)	21 July 1999	1 January 2003	3 years, 164 days	PSDB	Fernando Henrique Cardoso (PSDB)
13	Roberto Amaral	Roberto Amaral (born 1939)	1 January 2003	21 January 2004	1 year, 20 days	PSB	Luiz Inácio Lula da Silva (PT)
14	Eduardo Campos	Eduardo Campos (1965–2014)	21 January 2004	18 July 2005	1 year, 178 days	PSB	Luiz Inácio Lula da Silva (PT)
15	Sérgio Machado Rezende	Sérgio Machado Rezende (born 1940)	18 July 2005	1 January 2011	5 years, 167 days	PSB	Luiz Inácio Lula da Silva (PT)
16	Aloizio Mercadante	Aloizio Mercadante (born 1954)	1 January 2011	23 January 2012	1 year, 22 days	PT	Dilma Rousseff (PT)
17	Marco Antonio Raupp	Marco Antonio Raupp (1938–2021)	23 January 2012	17 March 2014	2 years, 53 days	Independent	Dilma Rousseff (PT)
18	Clelio Campolina Diniz	Clelio Campolina Diniz (born 1942)	17 March 2014	1 January 2015	290 days	Independent	Dilma Rousseff (PT)
19	Aldo Rebelo	Aldo Rebelo (born 1956)	1 January 2015	2 October 2016	1 year, 275 days	PCdoB	Dilma Rousseff (PT)
20	Celso Pansera	Celso Pansera (born 1963)	2 October 2015	14 April 2016	195 days	MDB	Dilma Rousseff (PT)
–	Emilia Curi	Emilia Curi (born 1963); Acting	14 April 2016	12 May 2016	28 days	Independent	Dilma Rousseff (PT)
21	Gilberto Kassab	Gilberto Kassab (born 1960)	12 May 2016	1 January 2019	2 years, 234 days	PSD	Michel Temer (MDB)
22	Marcos Pontes	Marcos Pontes (born 1963)	1 January 2019	1 April 2022	3 years, 90 days	PSL; PL	Jair Bolsonaro (PSL)
23	Paulo César Alvim	Paulo César Alvim	1 April 2022	1 January 2023	275 days	Independent	Jair Bolsonaro (PL)
24	Luciana Santos	Luciana Santos (born 1965)	1 January 2023	Incumbent	3 years, 104 days	PCdoB	Luiz Inácio Lula da Silva (PT)

== See also ==
- Ministry of Science, Technology, Innovation and Communications (Brazil) (MCTIC)
- Brazilian science and technology
- Brazilian Academy of Sciences
- List of federal institutions of Brazil
- Brazilian–Argentine Agency for Accounting and Control of Nuclear Materials
