= Ciência e Cultura =

Science magazine in Brazil

- Editor: Marcelo Knobel
- Categories: Science magazine
- Frequency: Three times a year
- Publisher: Sociedade Brasileira para o Progresso da Ciência
- Founded: 1949
- Country: Brazil
- Based in: São Paulo
- Language: Portuguese
- Website: Official website
- ISSN: 0009-6725
- OCLC: 2992970

Ciência e Cultura is a science magazine published by the Brazilian Society for the Advancement of Science (Sociedade Brasileira para o Progresso da Ciência, SBPC). The magazine is published three times a year.

== History ==
The magazine was established in 1949 by several scientists, including José Reis, the dean of popularization of science in Brazil. He was its editor-in-chief for more than 30 years.

Initially the magazine was conceived to be SBPC's flagship publication of original scientific articles, following the model of Science, published by the American Association for the Advancement of Science. The journal remained faithful to this concept until the 1990s, when it became clear that Brazilian scientists of high rank were not generally favouring the journal as a significant publication vehicle for their original research. Its editorial philosophy was then changed to a magazine of general debate on issues of science and technology. A brief attempt at publishing in English only was foiled and the magazine reverted to Portuguese as its publication language.

== Structure and aims ==
The journal's stated aims are "To act in the diffusion and scientific spreading and also the scene of the great cultural questions of our time, identifying trends and approaching proper subjects of the knowledge and the dynamics of its cultural, scientific and technological transformations." It is organized into the following sections: Editorial, Trends (Brazil and World), News, Articles, and Culture. Every issue is dedicated to a specific topic or theme. Currently it is published both in printed and on-line forms, the last being in full text and with free access on the Brazilian electronic library SciELO.

Its current editor-in-chief is Marcelo Knobel.
