= Glaci Zancan =

Brazilian biochemist

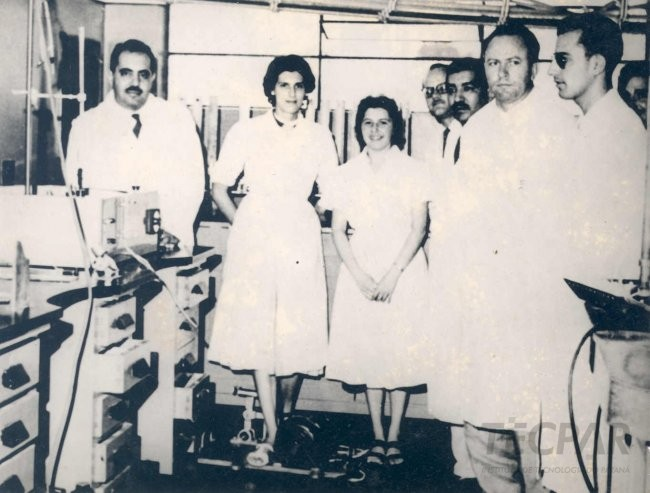
- Zancan (center-right) at the Institute of Biochemistry at the Federal University of Paraná
- Born: Glaci Teresinha Zancan; 16 August 1935; São Borja, Rio Grande do Sul, Brazil
- Died: 29 June 2007 (aged 71); Criciúma, Santa Catarina, Brazil
- Education: Federal University of Paraná
- Scientific career
- Fields: Biochemistry

Glaci Teresinha Zancan (16 August 1935 – 29 June 2007) was a Brazilian biochemist, president of the Brazilian Society for the Progress of the Science (SBPC) from 1999 to 2003. She made her post doctorate at the University of Buenos Aires, when working with Luis Federico Leloir, Nobel prize of Medicine of 1970.

== Life ==
Born in São Borja, the scientist defended the increase of the female participation in research, with the universalization of research in the universities, and among others, participated in the preparation of the "National Plan of Postgrade Studies 2005–2010" coordinated by CAPES.

She established herself in Curitiba, being professor of the Federal University of Paraná. She chaired the Brazilian Society of Biochemistry, vice-president of the SBPC from 1995 to 1999 and later president from 1999 to 2003. In her last years of life, she was member of the CAPES higher board and of the Education Council of the State of Paraná.

== Honours ==
- She received in 2000 the Great Cross of the National Order of Scientific Merit.

=== Eponyms ===
- In her honour it was instituted the "Trophy Women of Science Glaci Zancan"
