= Brazilian Telecommunications Society =

The Brazilian Telecommunications Society (Portuguese: Sociedade Brasileira de Telecomunicações or SBrT) is a scientific academy of Brazil. Created in 1983 with no competing financial interest, it is devoted to promoting the diffusion, the development and the interchange of ideas and results in the field of Telecommunications. The SBrT is co-sister society of the IEEE Communications Society. The meetings and conferences sponsored by SBrT are now a forum for scientific, technological debate.

The SBrT holds an annual scientific congress, the Brazilian Telecommunication Symposium (Simpósio Brasileiro de Telecomunicações), and each four years, the International Telecommunication Symposium – ITS (joint with IEEE).

It publishes the scientific journal – The Journal of Communication and Information Systems (JCIS), co-sponsored by the IEEE Communications Society. The SBrT also publishes the «Série Brasport», a series of textbooks on Telecommunications and correlated fields.

== See also ==
- Brazilian science and technology
