= Science and technology in Brazil =

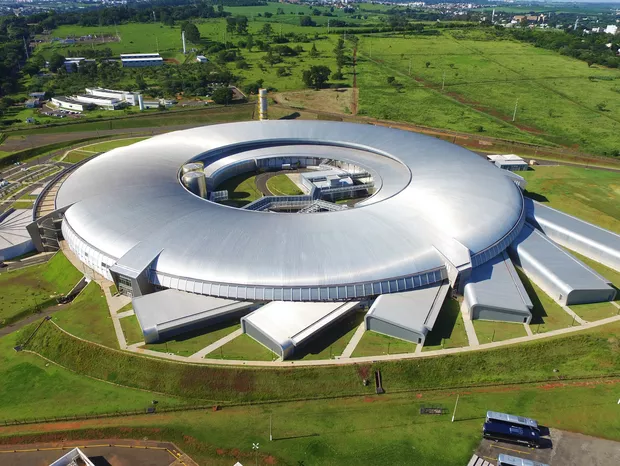
Laboratório Nacional de Luz Síncrotron in the city of Campinas

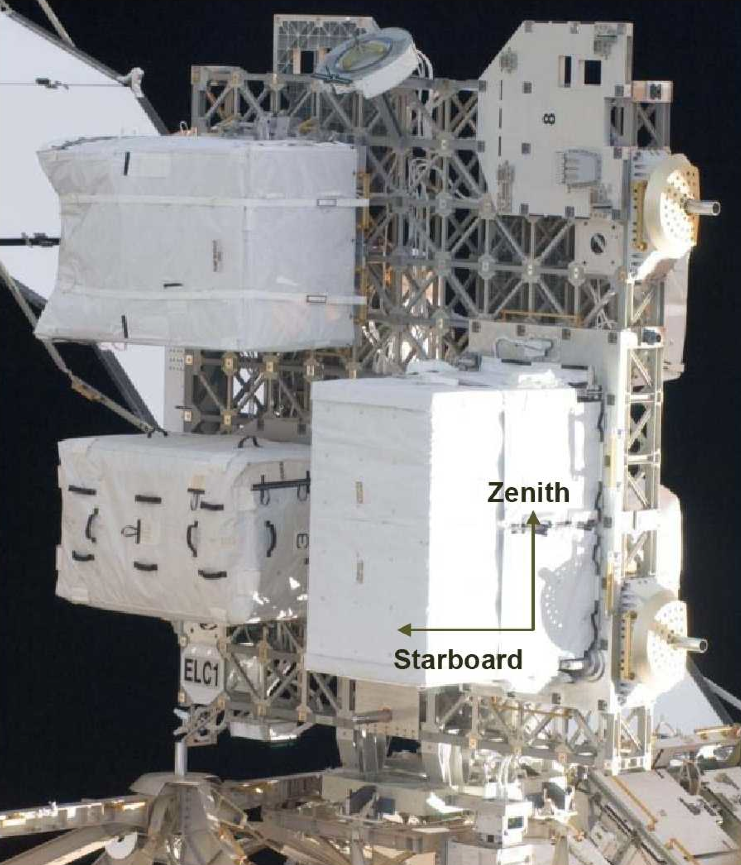
ExPRESS Logistics Carrier, a part-Brazilian made component on the International Space Station

Science and technology in Brazil has entered the international arena in recent decades. The central agency for science and technology in Brazil is the Ministry of Science and Technology, which includes the CNPq and Finep. This ministry also has a direct supervision over the National Institute for Space Research (Portuguese: Instituto Nacional de Pesquisas Espaciais — INPE), the National Institute of Amazonian Research (Portuguese: Instituto Nacional de Pesquisas da Amazônia — INPA), and the National Institute of Technology (Brazil) (Portuguese: Instituto Nacional de Tecnologia — INT). The ministry is also responsible for the Secretariat for Computer and Automation Policy (Portuguese: Secretaria de Política de Informática e Automação — SPIA), which is the successor of the SEI. The Ministry of Science and Technology, which the Sarney government created in March 1985, was headed initially by a person associated with the nationalist ideologies of the past. Although the new minister was able to raise the budget for the science and technology sector, he remained isolated within the government and had no influence on policy making for the economy.

With the new ministry, the science and technology agencies increased in size but lost some of their former independence and flexibility, and they became more susceptible to patronage politics. Most of the resources of the CNPq were channeled to fellowship programs procedures for quality control and no mechanisms to make the fellows active in the country's science and technology institutions. New groups competed for resources and control of the country's agencies of science, technology, and higher education. These groups included political parties, unionized university professors and employees, scientific societies, and special interest groups within the scientific and technological community. The SBPC (Brazilian Society for Scientific Development) shed its image as a semi-autonomous association of scientists to become an active lobbyist for more public resources and the protection of national technology from international competition. Brazil was ranked 52nd in the Global Innovation Index in 2025, up from 66th in 2019.

== History ==
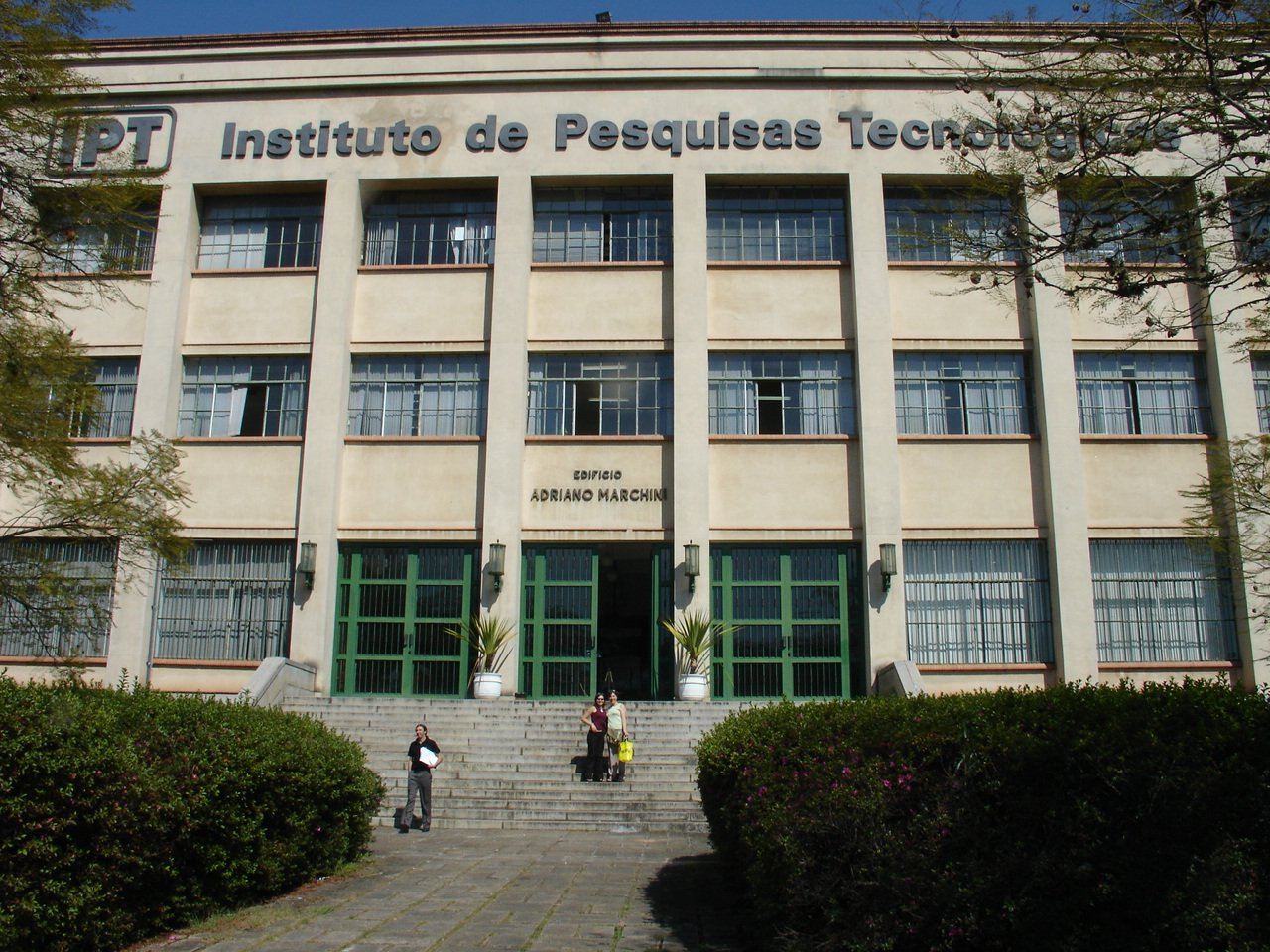
IPT - Instituto de Pesquisas Tecnológicas de São Paulo

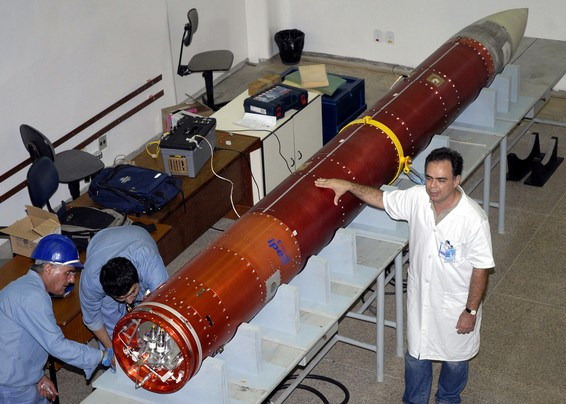
Rocket VSB-30 is assembled with its load util.

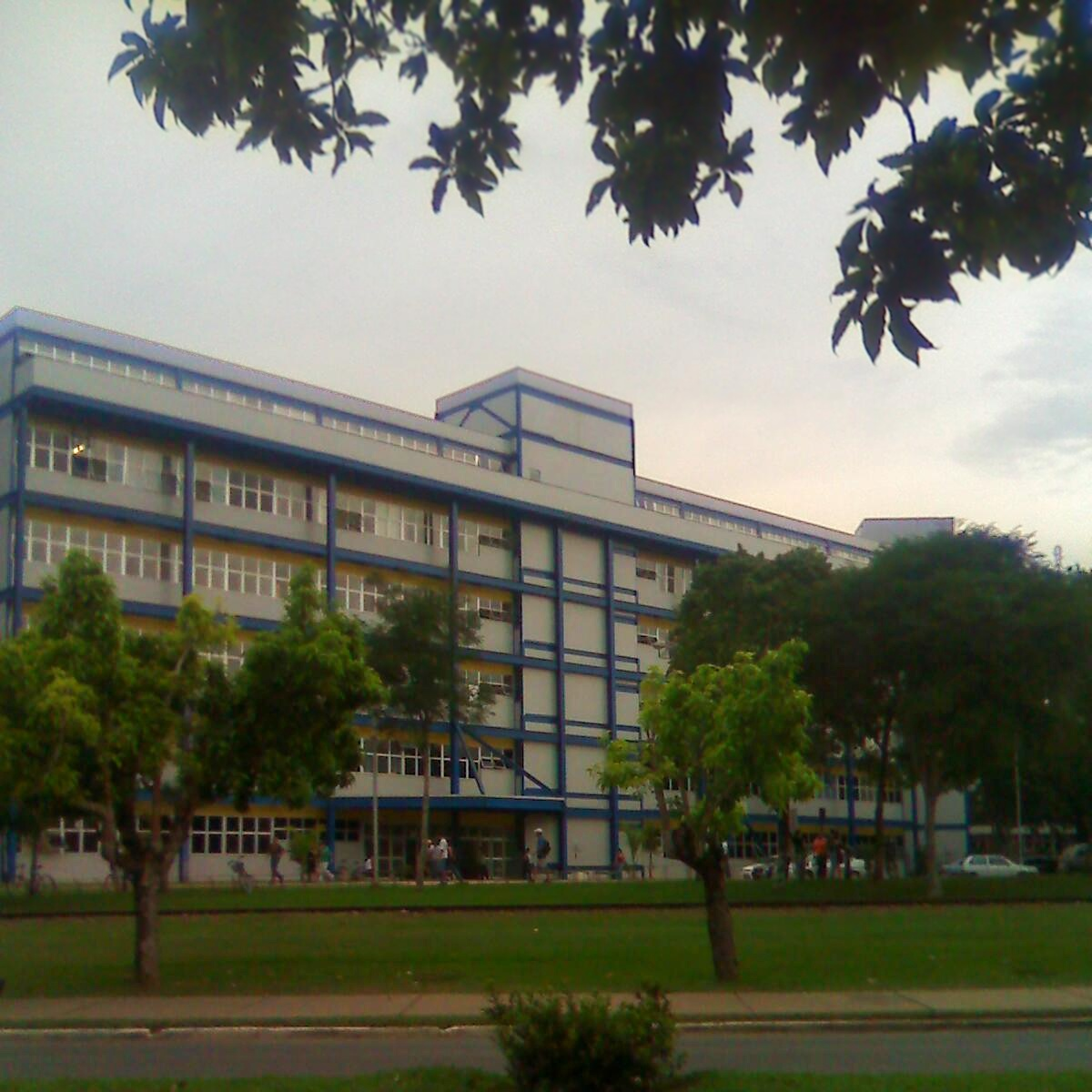
Center of Biological Sciences of Federal University of Viçosa

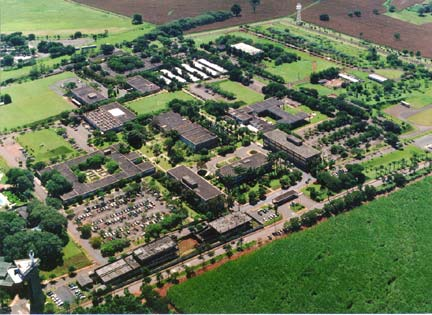
Technology pool in Campinas

Brazilian science effectively began in the first decades of the 19th century, when the Portuguese royal family, headed by D. João VI, arrived in Rio de Janeiro, escaping from the Napoleon's army invasion of Portugal in 1807. Like almost all territories and regions of the New World, Brazil was a Portuguese colony, without universities, and a few cultural and scientific organizations. The former American colonies of the Spanish Empire, although having a largely illiterate population like Brazil, Portugal and Spain, had, however, a number of universities since the 16th century. This may have been a deliberate policy of the Portuguese colonial power, because they feared that the appearance of educated Brazilian classes would boost nationalism and aspirations toward political independence, as it had happened in the United States and several Latin American former Spanish colonies. However, throughout the centuries of Portuguese rule, Brazilian students were allowed and even encouraged to enroll at higher education in mainland Portugal. In addition, mainland Portugal's population at the time was also largely illiterate and had for most of those period a single university, the University of Coimbra, which educated Portuguese people from all the Empire, including from the colony of Brazil.

The first firm attempts of having a Brazilian science establishment were made around 1783, with the expedition of Portuguese naturalist Alexandre Rodrigues Ferreira, who was sent by Portugal's prime minister, the Marquis of Pombal, to explore and identify Brazilian fauna, flora and geology. His collections, however, were lost to the French, when Napoleon invaded Portugal, and were transported to Paris by Étienne Geoffroy Saint-Hilaire. In 1772, even before the establishment of the Science Academy of Lisbon (1779), one of the first learned societies of both Brazil and the Portuguese Empire was founded in Rio de Janeiro - it was the Sociedade Scientifica, but lasted only until 1794. Also, in 1797, the first botanic institute was founded in Salvador, Bahia. During the late 18th century, the Real Academia de Artilharia, Fortificação e Desenho of Rio de Janeiro was created in 1792 through a decree issued by the Portuguese authorities as a higher education school for the teaching of the sciences and engineering. Both the engineering schools of the Rio de Janeiro Federal University and the Military Institute of Engineering were created and developed from the oldest engineering school of Brazil which is also one of the oldest in Latin America.

D. João VI gave impetus to all these accoutrements of European civilization to Brazil. In a short period (between 1808 and 1810), the government founded the Royal Naval Academy and the Royal Military Academy (both military schools), the Biblioteca Nacional, the Rio de Janeiro Botanical Garden, the Medico-Chirurgical School of Bahia, currently known as Faculdade de Medicina under harbour of Universidade Federal da Bahia and the Medico-Chirurgical School of Rio de Janeiro (Faculdade de Medicina of Universidade Federal do Rio de Janeiro).

Notable scientific expeditions organized by Brazilians were rare, the most significant one being that of Martim Francisco de Andrada e Silva and José Bonifácio de Andrada e Silva, in 1819.

=== During the Brazilian Empire ===
After independence from Portugal, declared by the King's son in 1822, D. Pedro I (who became the new country's first Emperor), the policies concerning higher learning, science and technology in Brazil came to a relative standstill. In the first two decades of the century, science in Brazil was mostly carried out by temporary scientific expeditions by European naturalists, such as Charles Darwin, Maximilian zu Wied-Neuwied, Carl von Martius, Johann Baptist von Spix, Alexander Humboldt, Augustin Saint-Hilaire, Baron Grigori Ivanovitch Langsdorff, Friedrich Sellow, Fritz Müller, Hermann von Ihering, Émil Goeldi and others. This science was mostly descriptive of the fantastic Brazilian biodiversity of its flora and fauna, and also its geology, geography and anthropology, and until the creation of the National Museum, the specimens were mostly removed to European institutions.

In the educational area, a number of higher education institutions were founded in the 19th century, but for decades to come, most Brazilian students, still studied at European universities, such as the ancient University of Coimbra, in Portugal.

Things started to change after 1841, when the eldest son of D. Pedro I, Emperor D. Pedro II came to the throne when he was 15 years old. In the next 50 years, Brazil enjoyed a stable constitutional monarchy. D. Pedro II was an enlightened monarch who favored the arts, literature, science and technology and had extensive international contacts in these areas. The mainstay of Brazilian science and the seat of its first research laboratories was the National Museum (Museu Nacional) in Rio de Janeiro, in existence until today. D. Pedro developed a strong personal interest and selected and invited many august European scientific personalities, such as von Ihering and Goeldi, to work in Brazil. He and his ministers, courtesans and senators often attended scientific conferences in the Museum. There, the first laboratory of physiology was founded in 1880, under João Baptista de Lacerda and Louis Couty. Unfortunately, the creation of research universities and institutes would only occur on the beginning of the 20th century - a long delay for the education, science and technology in Brazil.

The oldest scientific journal in Brazil, Archivos do Museu Nacional, was established in 1876.

== Organization ==
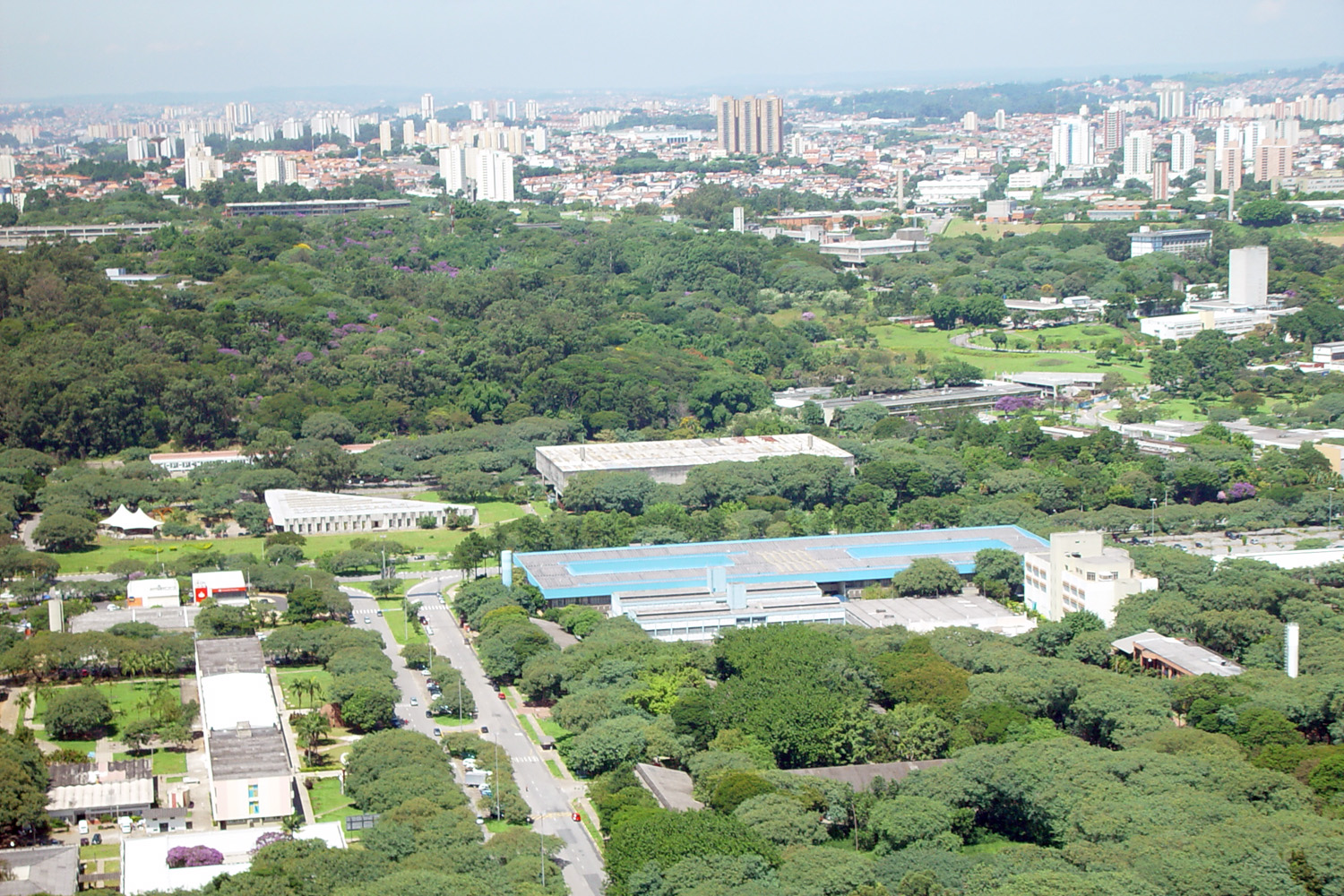
Aerial view of USP, located in São Paulo

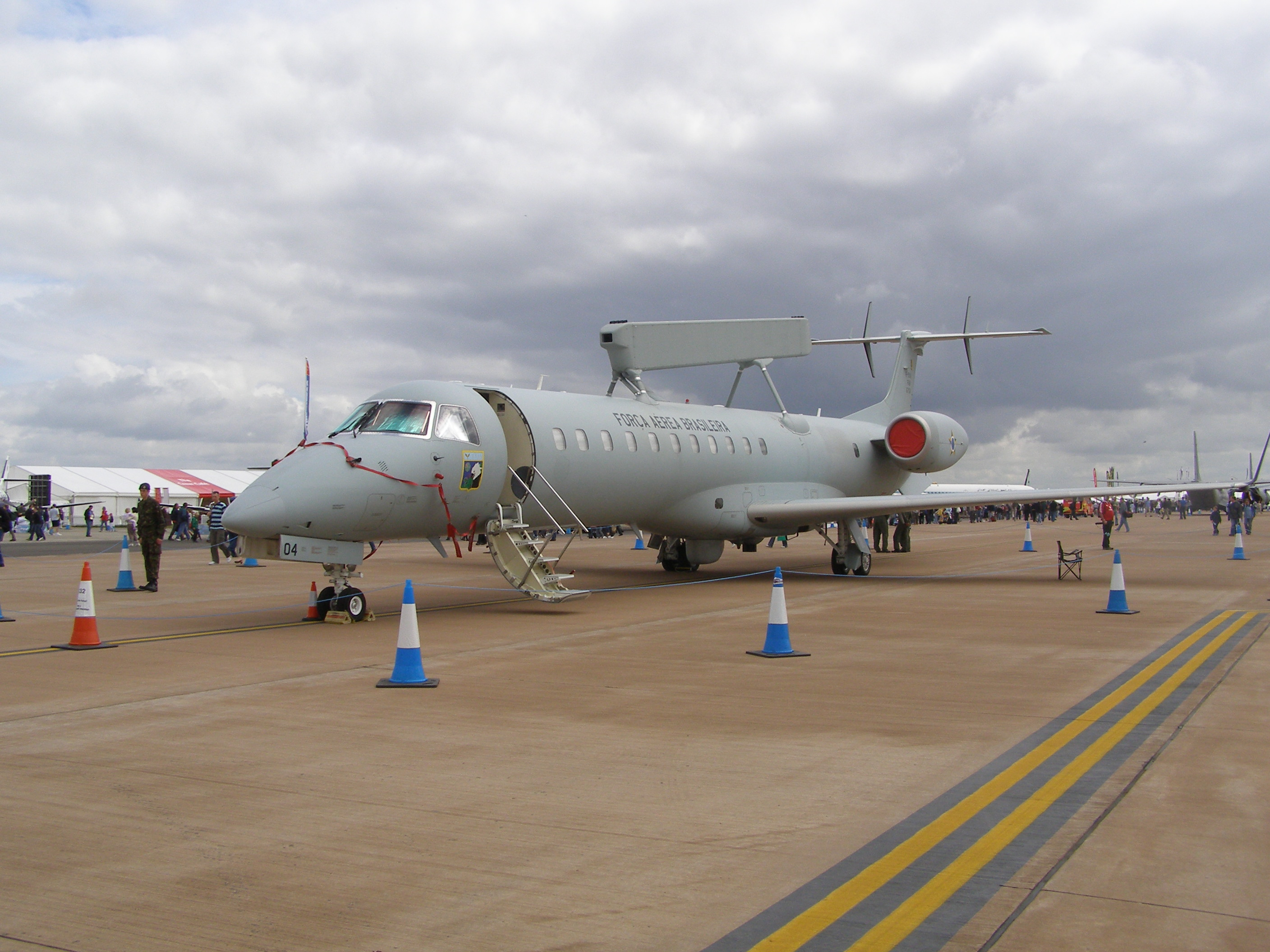
A Brazilian-made Embraer of Brazilian Armed Forces

Brazil today has a well-developed organization of science and technology. Basic research is largely carried out in public universities and research centers and institutes, and some in private institutions, particularly in non-profit non-governmental organizations. More than 90% of funding for basic research comes from governmental sources. Brazil is one of the three countries in Latin America with an operational Synchrotron Laboratory, a research facility for physics, chemistry, materials science and life sciences.

Applied research, technology and engineering are also largely carried out in the university sector and research centres, contrary to trends in more developed countries such as the United States of America, South Korea, Germany, Japan, etc.

== Sources of funding ==
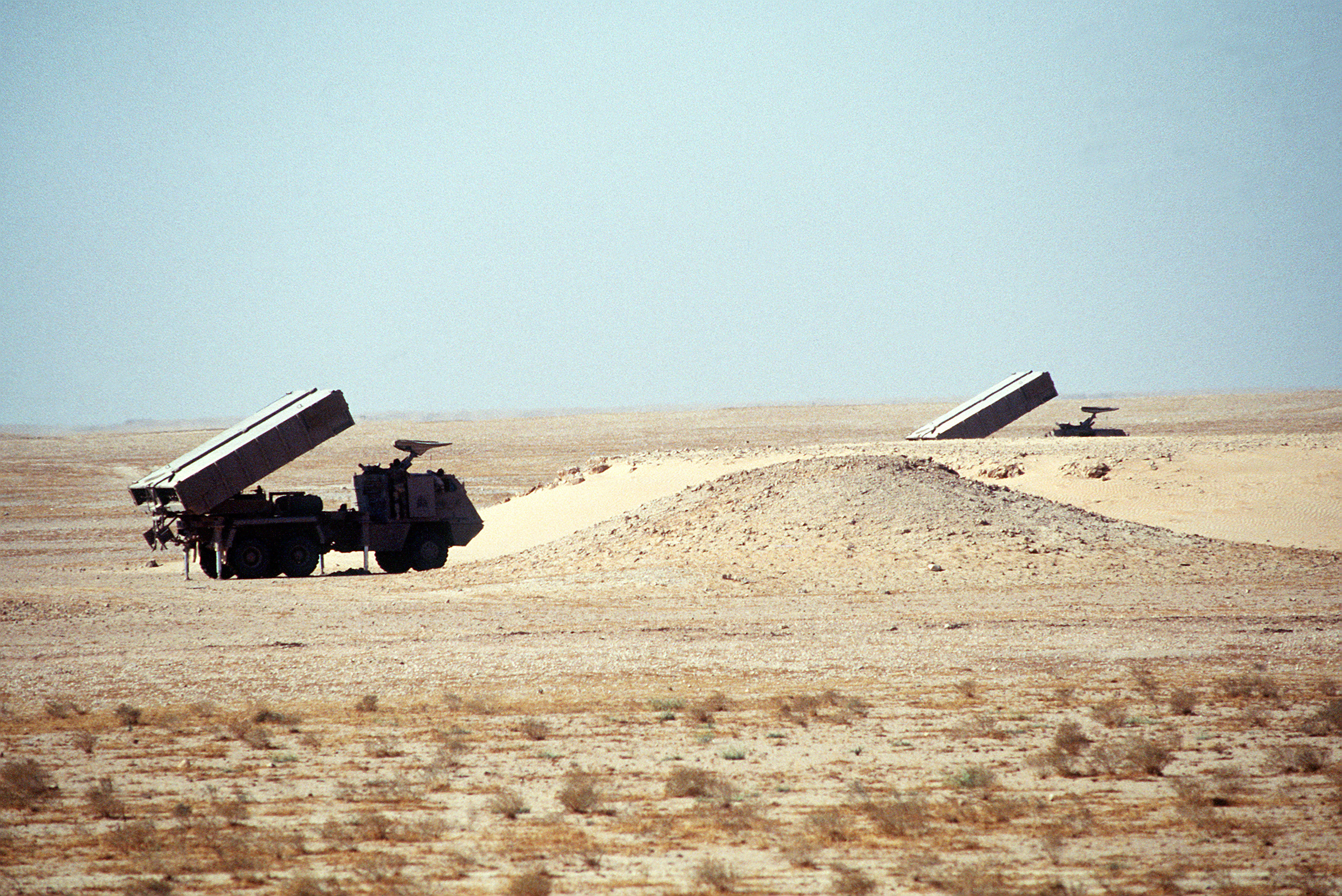
A Brazilian-made Avibras ASTROS-II SS-30 multiple rocket systems on Tectran 6x6 AV-LMU trucks stand in firing position while being displayed as part of a demonstration of Saudi Arabian equipment.

Brazilian funding for research, development and innovation comes from six main sources:

1. Government (federal, state and municipal) sources. There are a number of state organizations which were created mostly in the 1950s specifically for directly promoting and funding R&D&I, such as the National Research Council (CNPq), which is now named Conselho Nacional de Desenvolvimento Científico e Tecnológico and the National Agency for Financing Studies and Researches (FINEP), both a part of the Ministry of Science and Technology (MCT). MCT is a relatively novel ministry, having been created in 1990. Before this, CNPq was the only research granting institution at federal level, working directly under the Presidency of Republic. At state level, almost all states have founded their own public foundations for support of R&D&I, following the pioneering (and highly successful) example of São Paulo state, which created the Fundação de Amparo à Pesquisa do Estado de São Paulo (FAPESP) in 1962. Usually these foundations are guaranteed by changes in the state constitutions, along the 1980s and 1990s.
2. Indirect funding through the budgets of public and private universities, institutes and centers. Some universities, such as UNICAMP, have their own internal agencies, foundations and funds set apart and managed with the purpose of supporting R&D&I by their faculties and students.
3. Public companies, such as Embrapa (Brazilian Enterprise for Agricultural Research). Their source of revenue is the government itself (via budgetary allocations by ministries and state secretaries) and investment of a part of products and services sold.
4. Industrial, commercial and services private companies, usually for their own R&D&I centers, or via some fiscal benefit (tax exemption laws), such as the Informatics Law.
5. National private and non-for-profit associations and foundations, via statutory mechanisms or donations by private individuals or companies. An example is the Banco do Brasil Foundation.
6. Funding by other nations, international organizations and multilateral institutions, such as Rockefeller Foundation, Ford Foundation, Inter-American Development Bank, World Bank, UNESCO, UNDP, World Health Organization, World Wildlife Foundation, Kellogg Foundation, Bill & Melinda Gates Foundation, US National Science Foundation, Volkswagen Foundation, just to name a few of the more important ones in the history of Brazilian science and technology.

== Trends in science and technology ==
=== Creation of social organizations ===
Brazil's public research institutes and universities follow rigid rules that tend to make them difficult to manage. States may opt to develop their own research institutes and university systems but, as all laws and regulations are adopted at federal level, they all have to follow the same rules and regulations. Thus, they all come up against the same hurdles. These include extensive bureaucratic structures, an obligation to recruit staff, academic or otherwise, from among public servants, analogous career ladders and salary systems, an irregular flow of funds, overly complex procurement procedures and powerful unions in the civil service. A structural alternative was developed in 1998, with the creation of social organizations. These private, non-profit entities manage public research facilities under contract to federal agencies. They have the autonomy to hire (or fire) staff, contract services, buy equipment, choose the topics and objectives of scientific or technological research and sign research contracts with private companies. The flexibility accorded to these social organizations and their management style have made them a success story in Brazilian science. As of 2015, there were six such organizations:

- Institute for Pure and Applied Mathematics (IMPA);
- Institute for the Sustainable Development of the Amazon Forest (IDSM);
- National Centre for Research in Energy and Materials (CNPEM);
- Centre for Management and Strategic Studies (CGEE);
- National Teaching and Research Network (RNP); and
- Brazilian Research and Industrial Innovation Enterprise (Embrapii).

Embrapii is the most recent. It was established by the federal government in 2013 to stimulate innovation through a system of calls for proposals; only institutions and enterprises deemed eligible may respond to these calls, thus speeding up the whole process and offering applicants a greater chance of success; Embrapii was due to be assessed in late 2015.

=== Incentive measures and targets ===
Brazilian business sector's contribution to GERD as a share of GDP, 2012. Source: UNESCO Science Report: towards 2030 (2015), Figure 8.4.

In the late 1990s, as economic reforms took hold, legislation was adopted to stimulate private R&D. Arguably the most important milestone was the National Law on Innovation. Soon after its approval in 2006, the Ministry of Science, Technology and Innovation published a Plan of Action for Science, Technology and Innovation (MoSTI, 2007) establishing four main targets to be attained by 2010:

- Raise gross domestic expenditure on R&D (GERD) from 1.02% to 1.50% of GDP;
- Raise business expenditure on R&D from 0.51% to 0.65% of GDP;
- Increase the number of scholarships (all levels) granted by the two federal agencies, the National Research Council (CNPq) and the Foundation for Co-ordinating Capacity-building of Personnel in Higher Education (Capes), from 100 000 to 150 000; and
- Foster science and technology for social development by establishing 400 vocational and 600 new distance-learning centres, by expanding the Mathematics Olympiad to 21 million participants and by granting 10 000 scholarships at the secondary level.

GERD in Brazil by funding sector, 2004–2012. Source: UNESCO Science Report: towards 2030 (2015), Figure 8.3.

By 2012, GERD stood at 1.15% of GDP and business expenditure on R&D at 0.52% of GDP. Neither of these targets had thus been reached by this time. Concerning tertiary scholarships, CNPq and Capes easily reached the target for PhDs (31,000 by 2010 and 42,000 by 2013) but fell short of reaching the target for tertiary scholarships as a whole (141,000 by 2010). The target of the National Plan for Graduate Education 2005–2010 was for 16 000 PhDs to be granted by the end of the plan period. Since the actual number of PhDs granted stood at 11 300 in 2010 and less than 14 000 in 2013, this target has not been reached either, despite the fact that almost 42 000 federal PhD scholarships were granted in 2013.

PhD degrees obtained in Brazil, 2005–2013. Source: UNESCO Science Report: towards 2030 (2015), Figure 8.2.

On the other hand, the targets related to fostering a popular science culture have been partly reached. For instance, in 2010, over 19 million students took part in the Brazilian Mathematics Olympiad for Public Schools, up from 14 million in 2006. However, since then, the number of participants has tended to stagnate. Up until 2011, it was looking as if the targets for distance learning and vocational education might be reached but, as of 2015, there had been little progress.

=== Financial investment ===
Brazil's economic boom between 2004 and 2012 translated into higher government and business spending on research and development (R&D). Gross domestic expenditure on R&D (GERD) almost doubled to PPP$35.5 billion (in 2011 dollars). Most of this growth occurred between 2004 and 2010, when GERD climbed from 0.97% to 1.16% of GDP. In 2012, GERD stood at 1.15% of GDP. Since 2010, the government sector alone has been driving up R&D intensity, since the non-government contribution has actually declined from 0.57% to 0.52% of GDP (2012). Preliminary figures for 2013 indicate slight growth in government spending and a constant contribution from the business sector (relative to GDP). Business research expenditure is likely to contract from 2015 onwards until the economy shows signs of recovery. Even the most optimistic analysts do not expect this to happen before 2016. Fixed capital investment in Brazil is expected to decline further in 2015, especially in the manufacturing sector. This trend will certainly affect industrial research spending. The Petrobrás crisis is expected to have a major impact on investment in R&D, since it alone has accounted for about 10% of the country's annual fixed capital investment in recent years. The cuts to the federal budget announced in 2015 and other austerity measures should also affect government spending on R&D.

Almost all of non-government expenditure on R&D comes from private firms (private universities performing only a fraction of it). Between 2010 and 2013, this expenditure declined from 49% to 42% of domestic expenditure on research, according to preliminary government data. This trend is likely to last for some time. The business sector will, thus, have no chance of devoting 0.90% of GDP to R&D by 2014.

Researchers in Brazil by sector of employment, 2001 and 2011. Source: UNESCO Science Report: towards 2030 (2015), Figure 8.6.

Brazil's GERD/GDP ratio remains well below that of both advanced economies and such dynamic emerging market economies as China and, especially, the Republic of Korea. At the same time, it is quite comparable to the more stagnant developed economies such as Italy or Spain and other major emerging markets like the Russian Federation. It is also well ahead of other Latin American countries.

=== Industrial research ===
==== Trends in innovation activity ====
Between 2001 and 2010, there was a sharp decline in the share of research personnel employed by the business sector, from 40% (2001) to 26% (2010). This is contrary to the trend observed in most developed and major emerging countries. It partly reflects the expansion of research in higher education and partly the anaemic growth of industrial R&D.

Share of Brazilian researchers per 1000 labour force, 2001 and 2011. Source: UNESCO Science Report: towards 2030 (2015), Figure 8.5.

According to a 2014 survey by the UNESCO Institute for Statistics of innovative manufacturing firms in 65 countries, 85% of Brazilian firms are still at the stage of acquiring machinery, equipment and software to enable them to innovate. Among the other BRICS countries (Russian Federation, India, China and South Africa), the percentage varies between 64% and 71%. Some 17% of Brazilian firms conduct research and development in house, according to the survey, compared to 19% of Russian firms, 35% of Indian firms, 54% of South African firms and 63% of Chinese firms. Brazil is also the BRICS country which outsources research the least (7% of innovative firms), compared to one in ten in India and one in five in the other BRICS. Brazil also trails other Latin American countries. A much higher percentage of firms report in-house research and development in Costa Rica (76%), Argentina (72%), Mexico (43%), El Salvador (42%), Ecuador (35%) and Colombia (22%). Only 6% of Brazilian manufacturing firms collaborate with universities to develop innovative products and processes, a lower ratio than in Mexico (7%), Colombia (11%), Argentina and Cuba (15%) and, above all, Costa Rica (35%).

The tendency for research to flow from the public to the private sector is confirmed by Ruben Sinisterra, a researcher at the Federal University of Minas Gerais who has been developing drugs to alleviate hypertension. Brazilian universities now have the capacity to develop nanoscale materials for drug delivery, he says, but "our domestic pharmaceutical companies don't have internal capabilities in research and development, so we have to work with them to push new products and processes out to market".

Innovation activity ebbed in Brazil between 2008 and 2013, according to a survey of firms by the Brazilian Institute of Geography and Statistics (IBGE). The 2013 survey covered all public and private firms in the extractive and transformative sectors, as well as firms in the services sector involving technology. The drop in innovation was most noticeable in telecommunications, both as regards the production of goods (-18.2%) and services (-16.9%). It is the larger companies which seem to have reduced their innovative activities by the biggest margin between 2008 and 2011. Among companies with 500 or more employees, the share of those involved in developing new products declined from 54.9% to 43.0% over this period. A comparison of IBGE's innovation surveys over the periods 2004–2008 and 2009–2011 reveals that the 2008 crisis has had a negative impact on the innovative activities of most Brazilian firms. "Since 2011, the economic situation in Brazil has further deteriorated, especially in the industrial sector. Thus, it can be expected that the next innovation survey [in 2018] will show even lower levels of innovative activity in Brazil."

One reason for the drop in public and private investment in research is the economic slowdown. After peaking at 7.5% annual growth in 2010, the economy slowed before dipping into recession in 2015 (-3.7% growth). The government has been forced to adopt austerity measures and is now less able to collect revenue through the sectorial funds, since company profits are down in many quarters. Industrial output declined by 2.8% between November and December 2014 and by 3.2% over the entire year. The most recent data indicate that 2014–2015 may turn out to be the worst years in decades for industry, especially for the transformation subsector of the manufacturing industry’.

The economic slowdown was triggered by weaker international commodities markets, coupled with the perverse effects of economic policies designed to fuel consumption. For instance, Petrobrás artificially depressed petrol prices to control inflation between 2011 and 2014, under the influence of the government, its major stockholder. This in turn depressed ethanol prices, making ethanol uneconomic to produce. The ethanol industry was forced to close plants and cut back on its investment in research. Petrobrás' low pricing policy ended up eating into its own revenue, forcing it to cut back its own investment in oil and gas exploration.

The roots of the problem go deeper, though, than the current recession. Brazil's long-standing import substitution policy has protected locally produced goods from foreign competition, discouraging local businesses from investing heavily in research and development, as they are only competing with similar non-innovative companies operating within the same protectionist system. The consequence of this policy has been a gradual decline in Brazil's share of global trade in recent decades, especially when it comes to exports of industrial goods. The trend has even accelerated in the past few years. Between 2004 and 2013, the share of exports "dropped from 14.6% to 10.8% of GDP, despite the commodities boom, a trend that cannot be explained solely by the unfavourable exchange rate", asserts the report.

Basic commodities make up a growing proportion of Brazilian exports. Commodities peaked at 50.8% of all exports in the first half of 2014, up from 29.3% in 2005. Just one-third of goods (34.5%) were manufactured in 2014, a sharp drop from 55.1% in 2005. Within manufactured exports, only 6.8% could be considered high-tech, compared to 41.0% with a low-tech content (up from 36.8% in 2012).

Another factor in the drop in investment is that modern industrial development in Brazil is constrained by a lack of modern infrastructure, especially in logistics and electric power generation, along with cumbersome regulations relating to business registration, taxation or bankruptcy, all resulting in a high cost of doing business. Dubbed the Brazil Cost (Custo Brasil), this phenomenon is affecting the ability of Brazilian businesses to compete internationally and pursue innovation.

==== Information technology ====
Companies such as Motorola, Samsung, Nokia and IBM have established large R&D centres in Brazil, beginning with the IBM Research Center in the 1970s. One incentive has been the Informatics Law, which exempts from certain taxes up to 5% of the gross revenue of high technology manufacturing companies in the fields of telecommunications, computers, digital electronics, etc. The Informatics Law has attracted annually more than $1.5 billion of investment in Brazilian R&D. Multinational companies have also discovered that some products and technologies designed and developed by Brazilians have a nice competitivity and are appreciated by other countries, such as automobiles, aircraft, software, fiber optics, electric appliances, and so on.

During the 1980s, Brazil pursued a policy of protectionism in computing. Companies and administrations were required to use Brazilian software and hardware, with imports subject to governmental authorization. This encouraged the growth of Brazilian companies but, in spite of their development of products like MSX clones, the Lua scripting language and SOX Unix, the Brazilian consumers of computing were suffering from lesser offerings compared to foreign competitors. The government little by little authorized more and more imports until the barriers were removed.

In 2002, Brazil staged the world's first 100% electronic election with over 90% of results in within 2 hours. The system is particularly suited to a country with relatively high illiteracy rates, since it flashes up a photograph of the candidate before a vote is confirmed. Citizens could download a desktop module that relayed the votes to their homes in real time faster than the news networks could get them out.

In 2005, President Luiz Inácio Lula da Silva launched a "people's computer" to foster digital inclusion, with government finance available and a fixed minimum configuration. Having rejected the Microsoft operating system (Windows XP Starter Edition), it is being shipped with a Brazilian-configured Linux system offering basic functions such as word processing and internet browsing. Plans to make cheap internet access available have not yet come to fruition. In 2008, the Brazilian Government under Lula da Silva, founded the CEITEC, the first and only semiconductor company in Latin America.

=== Government research priorities ===
Brazilian government expenditure on R&D in Brazil by socio-economic objective, 2012. Source: UNESCO Science Report: towards 2030 (2015), Figure 8.7.

The lion's share of government expenditure on R&D goes to universities, as in most countries. This level of spending increased slightly from 58% to 61% of total government funding of R&D between 2008 and 2012. Among specific sectors, agriculture comes next, in a reflection of the sector's relevance for Brazil, the second-largest food-producing country in the world after the US. Brazilian agricultural productivity has risen constantly since the 1970s, due to the greater use of innovative technology and processes. Industrial R&D comes third, followed by health and infrastructure, other sectors having shares of 1% or lower of government expenditure. With some exceptions, the distribution of government spending on R&D in 2012 is similar to that in 2000. After a sharp increase in industrial technology from 1.4% to 6.8% between 2000 and 2008, its share of government expenditure declined to 5.9% in 2012. The share of space science and technology (civilian) has been pursuing a downward spiral from a high of 2.3% in 2000. Defence research spending had been curtailed from 1.6% to 0.6% between 2000 and 2008 but has since rebounded to 1.0%. Research into energy has also declined from 2.1% (2000) to just 0.3% (2012). Overall, though, the allocation of government R&D spending seems to be relatively stable.

In May 2013, the Brazilian administrative body Redetec contracted the Argentine company INVAP to build a multipurpose nuclear reactor in Brazil for research and the production of radioisotopes employed in nuclear medicine, agriculture and environmental management. INVAP has already built a similar reactor for Australia. The multipurpose reactor is expected to be operational by 2018. It will be based at the Marine Technology Centre in São Paulo, with the Brazilian company Intertechne building some of the infrastructure.

Electricity generation by type in Brazil, 2015. Source: UNESCO Science Report: towards 2030 (2015), Figure 9.8.

Brazil's ambitions for biodiesel caught the headlines in the late 2000s when global energy and food prices spiked but energy-related industries have always had a high profile in Brazil. The state-controlled oil giant Petrobrás registers more patents than any other individual company in Brazil. Moreover, electricity-producing companies are directed by law to invest a given percentage of their revenue in R&D. Although energy is a key economic sector, the government cut back its spending on energy research from 2.1% to 1.1% of the total between 2000 and 2008 and again to 0.3% in 2012. Renewable energy sources have been the primary victim of these cuts, as public investment has increasingly turned towards deep-sea oil and gas exploration off Brazil's southeast coast. One area that has been directly affected by this is trend is the ethanol industry, which has had to close plants and cut back its own investment in R&D. Part of the ethanol industry's woes have resulted from Petrobrás' pricing policies. Under the influence of the government, its major stockholder, Petrobrás artificially depressed petrol prices between 2011 and 2014 to control inflation. This in turn depressed ethanol prices, making ethanol uneconomic to produce. This policy ended up eating into Petrobrás' own revenue, forcing it to cut back its investment in oil and gas exploration. As Petrobrás alone is responsible for about 10% of all fixed capital investment in Brazil, this trend, along with the corruption scandal shaking the company since 2014, will certainly have ramifications for Brazil's overall investment in R&D.

Brazil generates nearly three-quarters (73%) of its electricity from hydropower. This contribution was as high as four-fifths in 2010 but the share of hydropower has been eroded by a combination of declining rainfall and ageing hydroelectric plants, many of which date back to the 1960s and 1970s. Intensive use of thermoelectric power plants operating on fossil fuels has compensated for much of the loss, since the share of new sources of renewable energy, such as solar and wind, in the energy mix remains small. Moreover, although Brazil has made great strides in the use of bioethanol in transportation, there has been little focus on research and innovation in energy generation, be it in terms of developing new sources of energy or improving energy efficiency. In light of the foregoing, there is little reason to expect public investment in energy R&D to rebound to the levels seen at the turn of the century that would rebuild Brazil's international competitiveness in this field.

Space science and technology have been a government priority for decades. In the late 1980s and 1990s, Brazil invested almost US$1 billion in developing space infrastructure around the National Institute of Space Research (INPE), leading to the launch of the first scientific satellite built entirely in Brazil in 1993 (SCD-1). Between 1999 and 2014, Brazil and China built a series of five remote sensing satellites for environmental monitoring within the China-Brazil Earth Resources Satellites (CBERS) programme. Brazil has now achieved the critical mass of skills and infrastructure required to dominate several space technologies. It is determined to master the complete chain of space technologies, from material sciences, engineering design, remote sensing, aperture-synthetic radars, telecommunications and image processing to propulsion technologies. The joint Argentinian–Brazilian SABIA-MAR mission will be studying ocean ecosystems, carbon cycling, marine habitats mapping, coasts and coastal hazards, inland waters and fisheries. Also under development is the new SARE series designed to expand the active remote observation of Earth through the use of microwave and optical radars.

Growth in Brazilian scientific publishing between 2005 and 2014. Source: UNESCO Science Report: towards 2030 (2015), Figure 8.9, data from Thomson Reuters' Web of Science, Science Citation Index Expanded.

=== Research output ===
Scientific publications increased by 308% between 2005 and 2014, primarily as a result of Thomson Reuters' decision to track a much larger number of Brazilian journals in its database between 2006 and 2008. Despite this artificial boost, the pace of growth has slowed since 2011. Moreover, in terms of publications per capita, the country trails both the more dynamic emerging market economies and advanced economies, even if it is ahead of most of its neighbours. When it comes to impact, Brazil has lost a lot of ground in the past decade. One possible cause may be the speed with which enrolment in higher education has expanded since the mid-1990s, especially as concerns students passing through the federal system of universities, some of which have resorted to hiring inexperienced faculty, including candidates without doctorates.

Relative impact of scientific publications from São Paulo and Brazil, 2000–2013. Source: UNESCO Science Report: towards 2030 (2015), Figure 8.11.

Relative shares of Brazilian states for investment for science and technology, 2012. Source: UNESCO Science Report: towards 2030 (2015), Figure 8.12.

Patent applications to the Brazilian Patent Office (INPI) increased from 20,639 in 2000 to 33,395 in 2012, progressing by 62%. Patent applications by residents grew at a rate of 21% over the same period.

International comparisons using the number of patents granted by the US Patent and Trademarks Office (USPTO) provide an indirect measure of the extent to which an economy may be seeking international competitiveness on the basis of technology-driven innovation. Brazil was granted 108 patents by the USPTO between 2004 and 2008 and 189 between 2009 and 2013. Although Brazil has registered strong growth in this field, compared to other emerging economies, it seems to be relatively less focused on international patenting than on publications. Between 2000 and 2013, it counted 10 patents per ten million inhabitants from USPTO, less than Argentina (14), China, India (12) or South Africa (25) and only slightly more than Mexico (9).

== Regional disparities ==
Brazil is a country with highly diverse levels of development across its 27 states. The southern and southeastern regions show a much higher level of industrialization and scientific development than the northern ones, some of which encroach on the Amazonian forest and river basin. The centre-west is Brazil's agricultural and cattle-raising powerhouse and has been developing rapidly recently. The starkest example of this contrast is the southeastern State of São Paulo. Home to 22% (44 million) of the country's 202 million inhabitants, it generates about 32% of GDP and a similar share of the nation's industrial output. It also has a very strong state system of public research universities that is lacking in most other states and hosts the well-established São Paulo Research Foundation. The State of São Paulo is responsible for 46% of GERD (public and private expenditure) and 66% of business R&D. It hosts 10 of the country's 18 research universities.

All indicators paint the same picture. Some 41% of Brazilian PhDs were granted by universities in the State of São Paulo in 2012 and 44% of all papers with Brazilian authors have at least one author from an institution based in São Paulo. São Paulo's scientific productivity (390 papers per million inhabitants over 2009–2013) is twice the national average (184), a differential which has been widening in recent years. The relative impact of publications by scientists from the State of São Paulo has also been systematically higher than for Brazil as a whole over the past decade. Two key factors explain São Paulo's success in scientific output: firstly, a well-funded system of state universities, including the University of São Paulo, University of Campinas (Unicamp) and the State University of São Paulo, all of which have been included in international university rankings;10 secondly, the role played by the São Paulo Research Foundation (FAPESP). Both the university system and FAPESP are allocated a fixed share of the state's sales tax revenue as their annual budgets and have full autonomy as to the use they make of this revenue.

The State of São Paulo concentrates three-quarters of public expenditure on R&D. Source: UNESCO Science Report: towards 2030 (2015), Figure 8.12.

Between 2006 and 2014, the share of Brazilian researchers hosted by southeastern institutions dropped steadily from 50% to 44%. Over the same period, the share of northeastern states rose from 16% to 20%. It is still too early to see the effect of these changes on scientific output, or in the number of PhD degrees being awarded but these indicators should logically also progress.

Despite these positive trends, regional inequalities persist in terms of research expenditure, the number of research institutions and scientific productivity. Extending the scope of research projects to other states and beyond Brazil would certainly help scientists from these regions catch up to their southern neighbours.

== Timeline ==
- 1792: Founding of the Royal Academy of Fortification, Artillery and Design, current Military Institute of Engineering (IME) and Polytechnic School of UFRJ (UFRJ).
- 1876: Founding of the First School of Mines in Brazil, today Federal University of Ouro Preto (UFOP).
- 1900: Founding of the Federal Institute Serotherapy, current Oswaldo Cruz Foundation (FioCruz).
- 1916: Founding of the Brazilian Society of Sciences, today Brazilian Academy of Sciences (ABC).
- 1917: Beginning of the publication of the Anais da Academia Brasileira de Ciências.
- 1920: Founding of the University of Brazil, current Federal University of Rio de Janeiro (UFRJ).
- 1922: Founding of the Top School of Agriculture and Veterinary, current Federal University of Viçosa (UFV).
- 1923: Founding of the Brazilian Society of Chemistry (SBCh).
- 1923: Founding of the Radio Society of Rio de Janeiro, the first radio broadcasting station still working under the name Rádio MEC in Rio de Janeiro.
- 1924: Founding of the Brazilian Association of Education.
- 1925: Institution of the Einstein Prize, in reason of his visit to Brazil.
- 1930: Founding of the National Institute of Weights and Standards, today National Institute of Metrology, Standardization and Industrial Quality (Inmetro).
- 1934: Founding of the University of São Paulo (USP).
- 1948: Founding of the Brazilian Society for the Progress of Science (SBPC).
- 1949: Founding of the Brazilian Center for Physics Research.
- 1950: Founding of the Aeronautical Institute of Technology (ITA).
- 1951: Founding of the National Research Council (CNPq).
- 1951: Founding of the Coordination of Improvement of Higher Education Personnel (CAPES).
- 1952: Founding of the National Institute of Amazonian Research (INPA).
- 1952: Founding of the Institute of Pure and Applied Mathematics (IMPA).
- 1953: Founding of the Brazilian General Command for Aerospace Technology (CTA).
- 1956: Founding of the National Nuclear Energy Commission (CNEN).
- 1961: Founding of the National Institute for Space Research (INPE).
- 1962: Founding of the São Paulo State Foundation for Research Support (Fapesp).
- 1962: Founding of the State University of Campinas (Unicamp).
- 1967: Founding of the National Agency for Financing Research and Projects (FINEP).
- 1976: Founding of the São Paulo State University (Unesp).
- 1980: Founding of the National Laboratory of Scientific Computing (LNCC).
- 1985: Founding of the National Laboratory of Synchrotron Radiation (LNRS), current National Laboratory of Synchrotron Light (LNLS).
- 1985: Founding of the National Laboratory of Astrophysics
- 1993: Institution of the National Order of Scientific Merit.
- 1994: Founding of the Brazilian Space Agency (AEB).
- 2006: Founding of the Federal University of ABC (UFABC).
- 2007: Founding of the National Laboratory of Science and Technology of Bioethanol (CTBE).
- 2010: Founding of the Federal University of Latin American Integration (UNILA).

== Lists ==
=== Major universities ===
==== Public universities and institutes ====
- UFAL - Universidade Federal de Alagoas (Federal University of Alagoas)
- IME - Instituto Militar de Engenharia (Military Institute of Engineering)
- ITA - Instituto Tecnológico de Aeronáutica (Aeronautics Technological Institute)
- UECE - Universidade Estadual do Ceará (State University of Ceará)
- UERJ - Universidade do Estado do Rio de Janeiro (Rio de Janeiro State University)
- UNIRIO - Universidade Federal do Estado do Rio de Janeiro (Federal University of the State of Rio de Janeiro)
- UFABC - Universidade Federal do ABC (Federal University of ABC)
- UFBA - Universidade Federal da Bahia (Federal University of Bahia)
- UFS - Universidade Federal de Sergipe (Federal University of Sergipe)
- UFC - Universidade Federal do Ceará (Federal University of Ceará)
- UFCG - Universidade Federal de Campina Grande (Federal University of Campina Grande)
- UFES - Universidade Federal do Espírito Santo (Federal University of Espírito Santo)
- UFOP - Universidade Federal de Ouro Preto (Federal University of Ouro Preto)
- UFF - Universidade Federal Fluminense (Federal University Fluminense)
- UFG - Universidade Federal de Goiás (Federal University of Goiás)
- UEG - Universidade Estadual de Goiás (State University of Goiás)
- UFJF - Universidade Federal de Juiz de Fora (Federal University of Juiz de Fora)
- UFMG - Universidade Federal de Minas Gerais (Federal University of Minas Gerais)
- UFPA - Universidade Federal do Pará (Federal University of Pará)
- UFPE - Universidade Federal de Pernambuco (Federal University of Pernambuco)
- UFPI- Universidade Federal do Piauí (Federal University of Piauí)
- UFPR - Universidade Federal do Paraná (Federal University of Paraná)
- UFRGS - Universidade Federal do Rio Grande do Sul (Federal University of Rio Grande do Sul)
- UFRJ - Universidade Federal do Rio de Janeiro (Federal University of Rio de Janeiro)
- UFRN - Universidade Federal do Rio Grande do Norte (Federal University of Rio Grande do Norte)
- UFSCAR - Universidade Federal de São Carlos (Federal University of São Carlos)
- UFSC - Universidade Federal de Santa Catarina (Federal University of Santa Catarina)
- UFSM - Universidade Federal de Santa Maria (Federal University of Santa Maria)
- UFV - Universidade Federal de Viçosa (Federal University of Viçosa)
- UnB - Universidade de Brasília (University of Brasília)
- UNESP - Universidade Estadual Paulista (São Paulo State University)
- UNICAMP - Universidade Estadual de Campinas (State University of Campinas)
- UNIFEI - Universidade Federal de Itajubá (Federal University of Itajubá)
- UNIFESP - Universidade Federal de São Paulo (Federal University of São Paulo)
- UNITAU - Universidade de Taubaté (University of Taubaté)
- USP - Universidade de São Paulo (University of São Paulo)
- UFT - Universidade Federal do Tocantins (Federal University of Tocantins)
- UTFPR - Universidade Tecnológica Federal do Paraná (Federal University of Technology – Paraná)

==== Private universities ====
- PUC-PR - Pontifícia Universidade Católica do Paraná (Pontifical Catholic University of Paraná)
- PUC-SP - Pontifícia Universidade Católica de São Paulo (Pontifical Catholic University of São Paulo)
- PUCCamp - Pontifícia Universidade Católica de Campinas (Pontifical Catholic University of Campinas)
- PUC-RJ - Pontifícia Universidade Católica do Rio de Janeiro (Pontifical Catholic University of Rio de Janeiro)
- UCB - Universidade Católica de Brasília - (Catholic University of Brasília)
- PUC-GO - Pontifícia Universidade Católica de Goiás - (Pontifical Catholic University of Goiás)
- PUC-MG - Pontifícia Universidade Católica de Minas Gerais (Pontifical Catholic University of Minas Gerais)
- PUC-RS - Pontifícia Universidade Católica do Rio Grande do Sul (Pontifical Catholic University of Rio Grande do Sul)
- IESB - Instituto de Educação Superior de Brasília (Brasília's Institute of Higher Education)
- ULBRA - Universidade Luterana do Brasil (Lutheran University of Brazil)
- Mack - Universidade Presbiteriana Mackenzie (Mackenzie Presbyterian University)
- UNIFOR - Universidade de Fortaleza (University of Fortaleza)
- Centro Universitário da FEI (Industrial Engineering College) www.fei.edu.br
- FAAP - Fundação Armando Alvares Penteado, São Paulo, São Paulo
- FAMEC - Faculdade Metropolitana de Curitiba, (Sistema FIEP - www.famec.fiepr.org.br)
- Universidade Feevale - FEEVALE University, Novo Hamburgo, Rio Grande do Sul

=== Research institutes ===
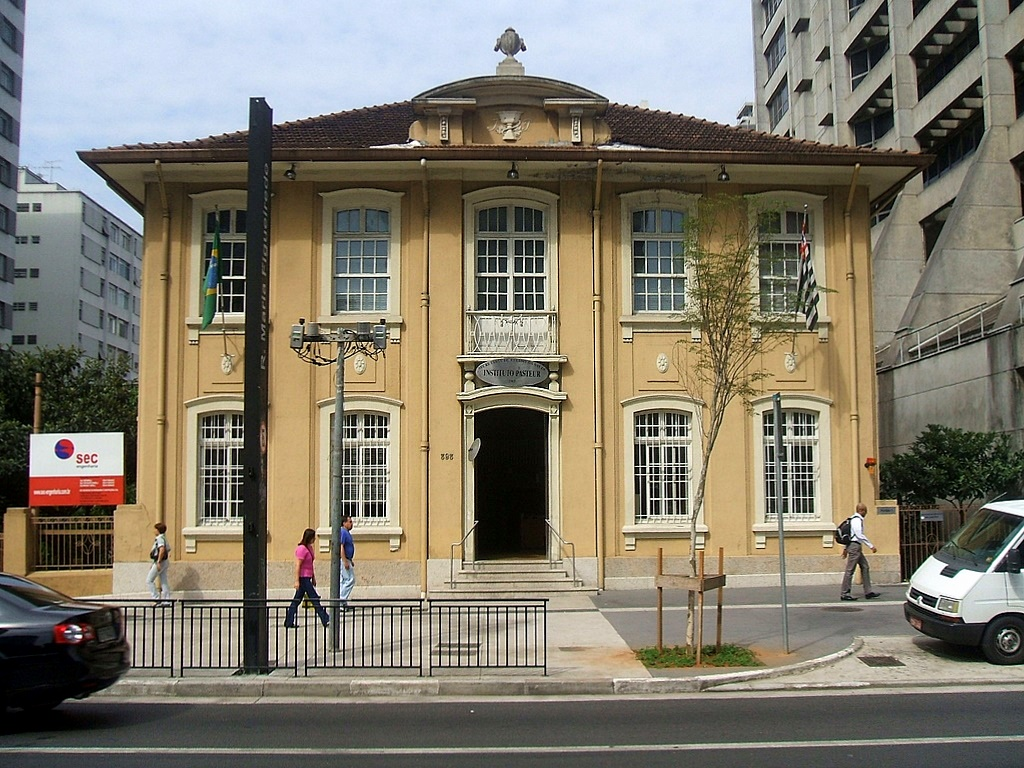
Pasteur Institute on Paulista Avenue, in Downtown São Paulo

- Brazilian General Command for Aerospace Technology (CTA) - São José dos Campos
- Centro de Pesquisa e Desenvolvimento em Telecomunicações (CPqD) - Campinas
- Centro de Pesquisas Renato Archer - Campinas
- Comandante Ferraz Brazilian Antarctic Base - Antarctica
- Edumed Institute for Education in Medicine and Health - Campinas
- Eldorado Institute - Campinas
- Empresa Brasileira de Pesquisa Agropecuária - Brasília
- Instituto Adolfo Lutz - São Paulo
- Instituto Agronômico de Campinas - Campinas
- Instituto Atlântico - Fortaleza
- Instituto Butantan - São Paulo
- Instituto de Biotecnologia Aplicada à Agropecuária (BIOAGRO) - Viçosa
- Instituto de Pesquisas da Amazônia - Manaus
- Instituto de Pesquisas em Energia Nuclear - São Paulo
- Instituto de Pesquisas Tecnológicas do Estado de São Paulo (IPT) - São Paulo
- Instituto Evandro Chagas - Belém
- Instituto Nacional de Matemática Pura e Aplicada - Rio de Janeiro
- Instituto Nacional de Pesquisas Espaciais (INPE) - São José dos Campos
- Instituto Oswaldo Cruz - Rio de Janeiro
- Laboratório Nacional de Computação Científica (LNCC) - Petrópolis
- Laboratório Nacional de Luz Síncrotron - Campinas
- Museu Paraense Emílio Goeldi - Belém
- Resende Nuclear Fuel Factory - Rezende
- São José dos Campos Technology Park - São José dos Campos

=== Scientific societies ===
- Brazilian Academy of Sciences
- Brazilian Society of Health Informatics
- Academia Nacional de Medicina
- Brazilian Computer Society
- Federação das Sociedades de Biologia Experimental
- Sociedade Brasileira para o Progresso da Ciência
- Brazilian Telecommunications Society
- Brazilian Power Electronics Society - SOBRAEP

== See also ==
- Ciência sem Fronteiras
- CNPq
- Lattes Platform
- Ministry of Education (Brazil)
- Universities and higher education in Brazil

== Sources ==
This article incorporates text from a free content work. Licensed under CC-BY-SA IGO 3.0. Text taken from UNESCO Science Report: towards 2030, 210-229, UNESCO, UNESCO Publishing.
