= Renato Archer =

Brazilian naval officer and politician

Minister of Science and Technology
- In office 15 March 1985 – 22 October 1987
- Preceded by: —
- Succeeded by: Luiz Henrique

Minister of Social Security
- In office 27 October 1987 – 28 July 1988
- Preceded by: Raphael Magalhães
- Succeeded by: Jader Barbalho

Personal details
- Born: 10 July 1922 São Luís, Brazil
- Died: 20 June 1996 (aged 73) São Paulo, Brazil
- Party: PSDB
- Occupation: Politician
- Profession: Naval officer

Renato Bayma Archer da Silva (10 July 1922 – 20 June 1996) was a Brazilian naval officer and politician. The Centro de Pesquisas Renato Archer (CenPRA), a federal R&D center located in Campinas, state of São Paulo, is named in his honour.

As a politician, he served as a vice-governor and federal representative to the state of Maranhão. He was known for his strong defence of the Brazilian nuclear power program. He also served as minister of science and technology during José Sarney's government.

== See also ==
- List of mayors of São Luís, Maranhão
