= Ralph Biasi =

Brazilian politician

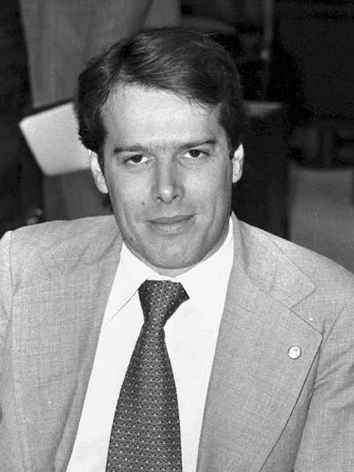

Mayor of Americana, São Paulo, Brazil
- In office 1973–1977
- Preceded by: Abdo Najar
- Succeeded by: Waldemar Tebaldi

Member of the Chamber of Deputies
- In office 1979–1991

Minister of Science & Technology (Brazil)
- In office 1988–1989
- President: José Sarney
- Preceded by: Luiz Henrique da Silveira
- Succeeded by: Roberto Cardoso Alves

Personal details
- Born: 11 October 1947 Americana, São Paulo, Brasil
- Died: 5 August 2017 (aged 69) São Paulo
- Occupation: Civil engineer, politician
- Known for: Youngest mayor of Americana

Ralph Biasi (11 October 1947 – 5 August 2017) was a Brazilian civil engineer who was elected the youngest mayor of the city of Americana, São Paulo, in the 1970s. He was responsible for various infrastructure improvements. He was a three-term federal deputy between 1979 and 1991, and was the federal Minister of Science and Technology from 1988 to 1989.

== Early years ==
Ralph Biasi was born on 11 October 1947 in Americana, (Note: The city of Americana was founded by US Confederates who would not accept their defeat in the American Civil War and moved to Brazil. As mayor of Americana in 1975 Biasi, who is of Italian origin, noted that, "Some people here maintain that Americana really didn't get going until after the Italian immigrants arrived, but the fact that our city was named for the Americans should be evidence that we haven't forgotten the Confederates' contribution to our past.) São Paulo, the son of Maury Biasi and Violeta Araújo. Biasi's family is Italian in origin. He studied civil engineering at the Faculty of Engineering in São Carlos of the University of São Paulo. From 1970 to 1972, he was Director of Rawa Engineering in São Carlos. He also worked for Unicasa Construtora, Eical and the prefecture of Osasco.

== Mayor of Americana ==
Ralph Biasi was mayor of Americana, São Paulo, from 1973 to 1977 as a member of the Brazilian Democratic Movement (MDB: Movimento Democrático Brasileiro). He was the youngest chief executive of the city. Biasi implemented most of the major works in the city plan including the second viaduct, the urban road terminal and improvements to the Feira Industrial de Americana (FIDAM) as a large venue for business events and exhibitions. In 1975 he invited the Portuguese sculptor Figueiredo Sobral to create a sculpture for the Americana city entrance.

In an August 2011 interview, Biasi asserted that Americana now had more employees than needed. He said he inherited a city administration with 421 employees and left it with 420 employees. There were 110 water and sewage employees and he left with 120 employees, but that was because he extended the sewage network. In 2012 Americana councilman Oswaldo Nogueira (DEM) proposed renaming the Viaduto Centenário after Biasi. The viaduct was built by Biasi, who had also built the Civic Center.

== Legislator ==
From 1980 Biasi was a member of the Brazilian Democratic Movement Party (PMDB: Partido do Movimento Democrático Brasileiro). He was a member of the Brazilian legislature in 1979–83, 1983–87 and 1987–91. Biasi was unusual in being elected a federal deputy at a time when only politicians from São Paulo were normally elected. After this other state representatives from Americana were elected. (Note: In Brazil each state is a single constituency with the number of seats in Congress based on population. The state of São Paulo elected 70 deputies in 2015, all of whom had to run state-wide campaigns.)

In 1980 and 1985 Biasi was president of the Chamber of Deputies committee of economic, industrial and trade development. From 1981 to 1983 Biasi was deputy leader of the PMDB in the House of Representatives. In 1981 Biasi introduced a bill in the House that would ban any foreign company from being established in Brazil that operated in a field where Brazilian companies already competed. He gave the reason as helping to end "the colonialism practiced by multinationals."

Biasi was Secretary of Science and Technology for São Paulo State from 1 June 1987 to 15 August 1988, and Brazilian Minister for Science and Technology from 16 August 1988 to 17 January 1989. He was appointed to the latter position by President José Sarney in place of Luiz Henrique da Silveira. Biasi left the ministry in January 1989, replaced by Roberto Cardosa Alves.

He died on 5 August 2017 at the age of 69.

== Publications ==
- Ralph Biasi (1986). Simposio sobre os deficits publicos e a renegociação da divida. Camara dos Deputados, Coordenação de Publicações. p. 193.
- Ralph Biasi (1989). Lei organica dos municipios: subsidios. Camara dos Deputados, Coordenação de Publicações. p. 14.

== Sources ==
- "11 de Outubro". projetovip.
- Bello (28 March 2015). "Cleaning up Latin American democracy". The Economist.
- Daniela Morelli de Lima (2002). Americana em um século: a evolução urbana de uma cidade industrial de porte médio. Annablume. ISBN 978-85-7419-321-2.
- "Figueiredo Sobral". Itaú Cultural (in Portuguese). Archived from the original on 2015-04-02.
- Jairo Guilherme Silva (7 June 2012). "Nogueira quer dar nome de Ralph Biasi ao Viaduto Centenário". WalterBartels (in Portuguese).
- Handler, Bruce (10 October 1975). "Brazil town founded by U.S. Confederates". The Des Moines Register. Des Moines, Iowa. p. 11.
- Handler, Bruce (10 April 1982). "Brazil's Business Problems Revolve About Foreign Dollars". Schenectady Gazette.
- José Sarney (16 August 1988). "POSSE DOS MINISTROS DA CIÊNCIA E TECNOLOGIA E DA REFORMA E DO DESENVOLVIMENTO AGRÁRIO" (PDF). Presidência da República.
- "Omar admite abrir mão de ser cabeça de chapa". TodoDia. 11 June 2014.
- "Para ex-prefeito Ralph Biasi, máquina pública está 'inchada'". O Liberal (in Portuguese). 20 August 2011.
- Prelúdio para uma história: ciência e tecnologia no Brasil. EdUSP. 2004. ISBN 978-85-314-0797-0.
- "Presidentes da Comissão de Desenvolvimento Ecônomico, Indústria e Comércio". Câmara dos Deputados.
- "RALPH BIASI - PMDB". Congresso Nacional (Brasil).
