= Luiz Henrique da Silveira =

Brazilian politician and lawyer (1940–2015)

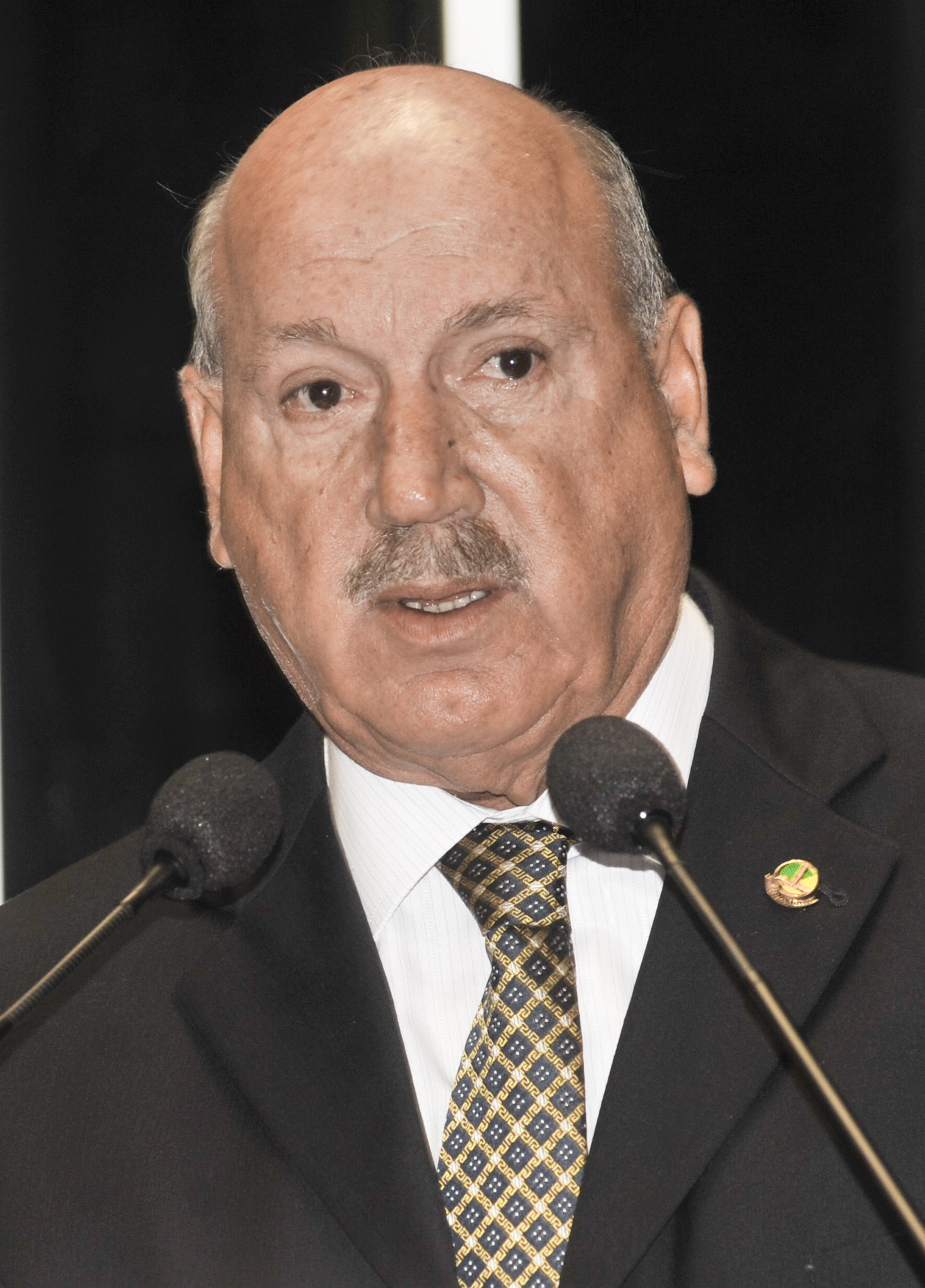

Senator from Santa Catarina
- In office January 1, 2011 – May 10, 2015
- Succeeded by: Dalirio Beber

43rd Governor of Santa Catarina
- In office January 1, 2003 – April 9, 2006
- Preceded by: Esperidião Amin
- Succeeded by: Eduardo Pinho Moreira

Governor of Santa Catarina
- In office January 1, 2007 – March 25, 2010
- Preceded by: Eduardo Pinho Moreira
- Succeeded by: Leonel Pavan

Minister of Science and Technology
- In office 23 October 1987 – 29 July 1988
- Preceded by: Renato Archer
- Succeeded by: Luiz André Rico Vicente (acting); Ralph Biasi

Personal details
- Born: February 25, 1940 Blumenau, Santa Catarina
- Died: May 10, 2015 (aged 75) Itapema, Santa Catarina
- Party: Brazilian Democratic Movement Party
- Profession: Lawyer

Luiz Henrique da Silveira (February 25, 1940 – May 10, 2015) was a Brazilian politician and lawyer. He represented Santa Catarina in the Federal Senate from 2011 to 2015. He was governor of Santa Catarina from 2003 to 2006 and 2007 to 2010. He was a member of the Brazilian Democratic Movement Party.

He died of a heart attack on May 10, 2015, in Itapema. His wife, Ivete da Silveira, later also became a senator for Santa Catarina.
