= José Reis (footballer) =

Portuguese footballer

Personal information
- Full name: José Matos Martins dos Reis
- Date of birth: 12 September 1911
- Place of birth: Loulé, Portugal
- Date of death: February 1939 (aged 27)
- Position: Goalkeeper

Senior career*
Years	Team	Apps	(Gls)
1931–1937	Belenenses		

International career
1936	Portugal	1	(0)
- * Club domestic league appearances and goals

José Matos Martins dos Reis (born 12 September 1911, died February 1939) was a Portuguese footballer who played as goalkeeper.

== Football career ==
Reis gained 1 cap for Portugal against Germany 27 February 1936 in Lisbon, in a 1-3 defeat.
