= Centro de Tecnologia da Informação Renato Archer =

Brazilian research center

Coordinates: 22.8522°S 47.1277°W

The Centro de Tecnologia da Informação Renato Archer (CTI) is a research and development center under the Brazilian Ministry of Science and Technology (MCT), previously named Fundação Centro Tecnológico para Informática (CTI), which was founded 1982. It is located in the city of Campinas, state of São Paulo, at the Rodovia Dom Pedro I. The center was thus named in honor of former Brazilian politician, naval officer and minister of science and technology Renato Archer.

The Center has the aim of developing and implementing scientific and technological research in the areas of information technology, microelectronics and automation. One of its missions is to establish collaborative ties with the corresponding industrial sectors in Brazil, in order to carry out technology transfer.Presently it has 160 public servants and 500 contractors working in its 12 laboratories.
