= Jorge Americano =

Brazilian judge

Jorge Americano (August 25, 1891 – February 6, 1969) was a Brazilian jurist, politician, writer, and professor who served as a judge of the Permanent Court of Arbitration in The Hague. He is also remembered for his writings on civil procedure and international law.

== Biography ==
Born in São Paulo, he completed his secondary education at the Gymnásio do Estado de São Paulo before enrolling at the Faculty of Law of São Paulo. As a student, he began working as a scrivener and graduated in 1912. In 1915, after a brief stint at the state's Department of Finance, he joined the Public Prosecutor's Office, working in Bebedouro and later Atibaia. In 1921, he moved to Santos, where he established his law office and prepared to apply for a professorship at his alma mater.

In 1926, he obtained his habilitation in civil law with the thesis Dos Direitos que se exteriorizam pela Posse. The following year, he was elected a state deputy for São Paulo running for the Paulista Republican Party. During his tenure, he was part of the commission that organized the state's civil procedure code. In 1928, he was appointed Chief Prosecutor of the state of Rio de Janeiro by Washington Luís, but abandoned the office with the Revolution of 1930.

Settled in São Paulo, he continued his law practice alongside lecturing as a substitute professor at the Faculty of Law and teaching Brazilian literature at the Colégio de São Bento and civil law at the Escola de Comércio Álvares Penteado. After supporting the Constitutionalist Revolution of 1932, he was elected federal deputy and partook in the 1933 Constituent Assembly. The same year, he was appointed full professor at the Arcadas with the thesis Ensaio sobre o Enriquecimento sem causa. During this period, he also worked as a jurisconsult.

In 1941, he was appointed rector of the University of São Paulo, serving until 1946. In 1945, he acted as secretary of education of the state of São Paulo. In 1948, he became the first president of the Sociedade Brasileira para o Progresso da Ciência. He was active in the establishment of the Faculty of Law of Mackenzie Presbyterian University and served as its first director. He authored the cycle of memoirs São Paulo Naquele Tempo (1957), São Paulo Nesse Tempo (1962), and the posthmous São Paulo Neste Tempo, recounting his impressions of the growing metropolis.
