= Sociedade Brasileira para o Progresso da Ciência =

Brazilian scientific society

Brazilian Society for the Progress of Science
- Sociedade Brasileira para o Progresso da Ciência
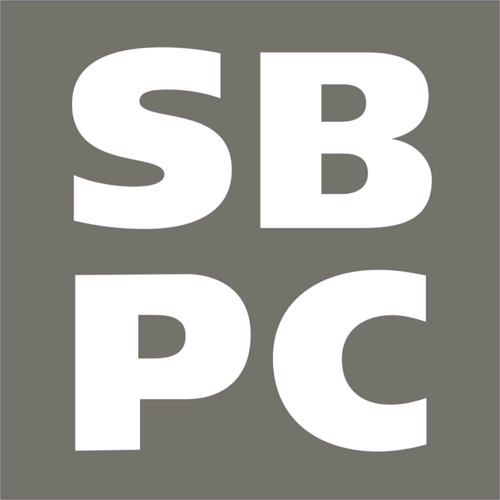
- Abbreviation: SBPC
- Formation: 8 July 1948; 77 years ago
- Type: Nonprofit
- Location: São Paulo, Brazil
- Official language: Portuguese
- President: Renato Janine Ribeiro
- Website: portal.sbpcnet.org.br

Sociedade Brasileira para o Progresso da Ciência (Portuguese for Brazilian Society for the Progress of Science) is a Brazilian scientific society created in 1948 by several prominent scientists, with the aim of promoting science, culture and education in the country by means of publications, conferences and political actions on behalf of science's advancement and progress. It was formed in the same spirit of two venerable institutions in the English-speaking world, the British Association for the Advancement of Science (founded 1831) and the American Association for the Advancement of Science (AAAS, founded 1848).

The first president was Prof. Jorge Americano, and among the founders there were important scientific personalities of the country, such as Paulo Sawaya, José Reis, Maurício Rocha e Silva, Gastão Rosenfeld and José Ribeiro do Vale, Otto Guilherme Bier, Henrique da Rocha Lima, Alberto Carvalho da Silva, Helena Nader and others.

The Society has individual members as well as other Brazilian scientific societies and associations which can become affiliate to SBPC. The current president is Dr. Ennio Candotti, a physicist. Honour presidents are Aziz Ab'Sáber, Crodowaldo Pavan, José Goldemberg, José Leite Lopes, Oscar Sala, Ricardo de Carvalho Ferreira, Sérgio Henrique Ferreira and Warwick Estevam Kerr.

SBPC's first flagship publication was Ciência e Cultura (Science and Culture), started in 1951 under the editorship of Dr. José Reis, a respected biomedical scientist and the dean of popularization of science in Brazil (there is a National Award conceded by the National Council for Research and Technological Development to the best science writers and projects on public understanding of science named after him). The journal's ambition was to be like Science, AAAS' scientific publication.

The greatest endeavour of SBPC has been the organization of yearly scientific conferences at national and regional level, since its year of birth, and without interruption. In the 1970s, during the oppression of civil liberties by the military regime, these conferences became an important public forum for discussion of issues on political freedom, since they were more or less left alone by the military repression apparatus, which acted hugely and mercilessly against mass media communication, student, workers and political organizations. The first conference was held in Campinas, São Paulo, in 1949 and had 104 participants. In the next meetings, in Curitiba (1950) and Belo Horizonte (1951), increasing participation and enthusiasm followed, with the Brazilian Academy of Sciences first involvement, as well as of other scientific societies.

Another significant publications are Jornal da Ciência (Science Newspaper), a daily news email service, site and printed publication; and ComCiência, an on-line scientific journalism review, edited by the Laboratory of Advanced Studies of Journalism (Labjor) of the State University of Campinas.

SBPC has spawned a number of initiatives with the objective of popularizing science and serving science education. One of them is the Instituto Ciência Hoje (Science Today Institute), a not-for-profit non-governmental organization of public interest. ICH publishes Ciência Hoje magazine since 1982, Ciência Hoje das Crianças (Children's Science Today) since 1986, and a series of complementary didactic books for schools titled Ciência Hoje na Escola (Science Today at the School) since 1996. Since 1997, the Institute also maintains an Internet site, "Ciência Hoje On-line".

== Bibliography ==
- Fernandes, A.M. A construção da ciência no Brasil e a SBPC: Editora da UnB/CNPq/ANPOCS., Brasília, 1990. (In Portuguese)

== See also ==
- Brazilian science and technology
