= Roberto Salmeron =

Brazilian nuclear physicist (1922–2020)

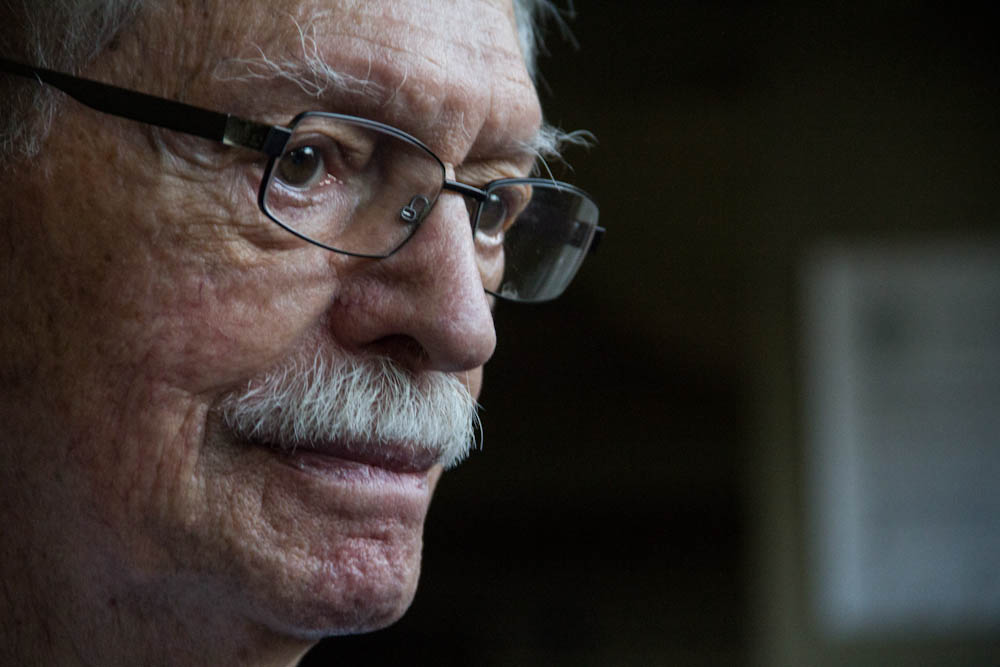

Roberto Aureliano Salmeron (June 16, 1922 – June 17, 2020) was a Brazilian electrical engineer and experimental nuclear physicist and an emeritus Research Director at the French National Centre for Scientific Research (CNRS).

Salmeron was born in São Paulo. He did his undergraduate studies in electrical engineering at the Escola Politécnica da Universidade de São Paulo, in São Paulo, and in physics in the Federal University of Rio de Janeiro (then named Universidade do Brasil), in Rio de Janeiro. From 1947 to 1950, he worked as researcher and physics instructor at the Escola Politécnica and in the Department of Physics of the Faculty of Philosophy, Sciences and Letters of the University of São Paulo, where he studied cosmic radiation under Italian physicists Gleb Wataghin and Giuseppe Occhialini. From 1950 to 1953, Salmeron worked at the recently created Centro Brasileiro de Pesquisas Físicas (Brazilian Center of Physical Research) in Rio. In São Paulo and Rio, Salmeron was contemporary of a brilliant generation of young Brazilian physicists, such as César Lattes, José Leite Lopes, Oscar Sala, Mário Schenberg, Marcelo Damy de Souza Santos and Jayme Tiomno.

From 1953 onwards, Salmeron lived in Europe, first doing his Ph.D. from 1953 to 1955 at the University of Manchester, under Patrick Blackett, Nobel Prize winner of Physics, and then as an associate researcher in the European Organization for Nuclear Research (CERN), in Geneva, Switzerland, from 1955 to 1963.

In 1963, Salmeron returned to Brazil and accepted a post as professor of physics in the newly created Universidade de Brasília. Unfortunately, the military dictatorship repressed strongly the faculty with liberal and leftist ideas and he joined 223 other professors in protest, who resigned from the University in October 1965.

In 1966 Salmeron left definitely Brazil and went to work in Europe at CERN again, where he had an important role in experiments attempting to discover the quark–gluon plasma. Afterwards (1967) he worked at the École Polytechnique in Paris, France, one of the most important schools of engineering in the world.

== Bibliography ==
- R Aldrovandi, A Santoro and J M Gago (eds): Roberto Salmeron Festschrift: a Master and a Friend. AIAFEX, Rio de Janeiro. ISBN 85-85806-02-8.
- Conto dos 13 Príncipes, Palaiseau 2002
