= Marietta Kurz =

American charged Pi-meson discoverer

Marietta Kurz was the first person to find evidence of the subatomic particles known as mesons, specifically pions.

== Career ==
Kurz was employed by Cecil Powell's research team at the University of Bristol as a "scanner", tasked to search for the tracks left by subatomic events recorded in photographic plates. Like most other scanners, Kurz was not a trained physicist. Her work as a scanner consisted of studying images under microscopes. These images came from silver trails left by charged particles passing through a glass plate coated with photographic emulsion.

On March 7, 1947, while inspecting a plate, Kurz noticed a track of silver particles through her microscope that showed a meson stopping and another one continuing from where the first had terminated. She recorded this with a sketch in her notebook and the words "double meson" in capitals. Powell and Hugh Muirhead immediately realized the significance.

Though the decay event was clear, the resultant track was incomplete, having left the edge of the plate. However, further images were discovered within days by Kurz's colleague, Irene Roberts. These tracks, having a length of about 600 micrometers, allowed the new pion particle's mass to be determined. This provided the substance for a paper submitted to Nature by César Lattes, Hugh Muirhead, Giuseppe Occhialini, and Powell. Kurz was credited in the caption for the original track's image. Powell was awarded the Nobel Prize in 1950.

== Legacy ==
Kurz's notebook is now displayed as part of the University of Bristol's Special Collections.
