= Institute of Physics of the University of São Paulo =

Department of the University of São Paulo

Coordinates: 23.5602°S 46.7349°W

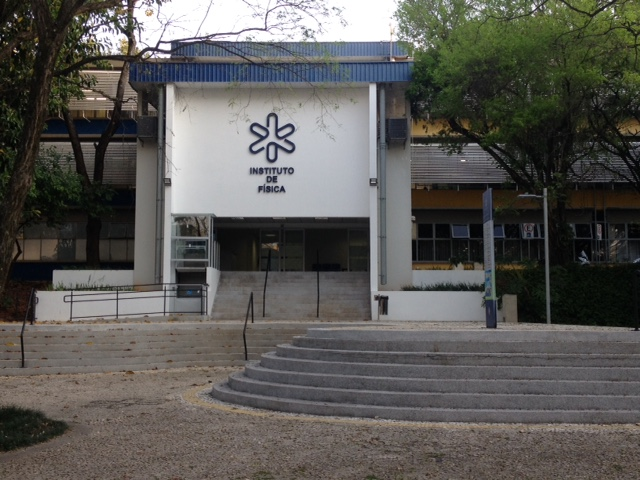
Reopening of the entrance on the Matão Street to the Institute of Physics.

The Institute of Physics of the University of São Paulo (Portuguese: Instituto de Física da Universidade de São Paulo), also known as IFUSP, is the largest and oldest physics research and teaching institution in Brazil. It is a public higher education unit located on the Armando de Salles Oliveira University City, in São Paulo. Created in 1970, it is the result of the combination of the Physics departments of the Polytechnic School of the University of São Paulo and of the former Faculty of Philosophy, Sciences and Languages.

In 2021, the Institute had 388 postgraduate students (163 master's, 176 doctoral and 49 special) and 1,112 undergraduate students enrolled in the second semester (630 bachelor's and 482 undergraduate). Its administrative team includes 118 teaching staff and 257 technical-administrative staff. In 2007, according to the Brazilian Physical Society (SBF), IFUSP contributed more than 40% of national research in physics, playing a leading role in teaching, research and the development of extension activities and programs in the area.

Its architectural complex includes more than 20 buildings that house classrooms, auditoriums, teaching and research laboratories, workshops and administration offices. The built-up area totals 40,000 m^{2}, out of a total floor space of 80,000 m^{2}. The site also has a restaurant, popularly known as "Bandejão", which provides meals for students from the university and abroad, as long as they are registered and authorized in advance to eat there. Like all of the university's departments, IFUSP is maintained by the transfer of funds from the São Paulo State Treasury. It also receives subsidies from various funding agencies, such as CNPq, FINEP, CAPES and FAPESP, with which it maintains experimental laboratories in nuclear physics, detectors and instrumentation, solid-state and low-temperature physics, plasma physics, crystallography, optics, molecular beam epitaxy, electron microscopy, biophysics, air pollution, materials analysis by ion beams, and more.

Initially created in 1934 as a unit of the Faculty of Philosophy, Sciences and Languages of the University of São Paulo (FFCL-USP) by the physicist Gleb Wataghin, the institute was established in December 1969 through an academic reform that approved the foundation of several divisions within the university. In the early 1970s, IFUSP was inaugurated with three departments: Nuclear Physics, Materials Physics and Mechanics, and General and Experimental Physics, which represented the main research topics at the time.

== History ==
In order to fill the teaching staff of the future FFLC-USP, the engineer-mathematician Teodoro Ramos invited the physicist Enrico Fermi (Nobel Prize in Physics in 1938) to join the division of Mathematics and Physics. However, Fermi chose to stay in Rome and suggested Gleb Vassielievich Wataghin, a young Ukrainian physicist who had become a naturalized Italian citizen. He initially refused the proposal but ended up accepting it and moving to Brazil in April 1934.

With the mission of teaching at USP, Wataghin arrived in São Paulo and established himself as a professor in the nuclear unit of FFCL-USP, whose specific task was to develop the scientific side and create the laboratories and all the necessary structures in the university. His presence in Brazil introduced a new conception of physics teaching and created two lines of research, one focused on theoretical physics and the other on the experimental physics of cosmic rays.

During his projects, Wataghin brought many physicists to Brazil on permanent assignments. The first was Giuseppe Occhialini (familiarly known in Italian physics as Beppo), who was already famous for having provided, in 1933, together with Blackett, confirmation of the existence of the positive electron (positron); shortly before that, Carl David Anderson had announced the discovery. In addition to these, Brazil also received great scientists who collaborated with them, including Arthur Compton, Hideki Yukawa, David Bohm and many others.

The first class of USP physicists graduated in 1936 and was composed of students who would become notable researchers, such as Marcello Damy de Souza Santos and Mario Schenberg. The second class, formed in 1937, included the first female physics graduate in Brazil, Yolande Monteux, who had work of recognized importance presented at workshops in the following years and, for more than 20 years, was one of the few women with a university degree working at the Technological Research Institute (IPT).

Among the 1936 graduates, Mario Scheberg, one of the main icons of physics in Brazil, became Wataghin's assistant in 1937 and, commissioned by the State Government, traveled to Italy and Switzerland where he worked with Enrico Fermi and Wolfgang Pauli. Back at USP, he worked with Giuseppe Occhialini, on cosmic rays, with Abrahão de Moraes, on dielectric physics, and with Walter Schützer and César Lattes, on calculations of the fundamentals of electromagnetism; he also published in the Annals of the Brazilian Academy of Sciences. Wataghin remained in Brazil until 1949 and continued his career in Italy, but his legacy passed from generation to generation.

== Structure ==
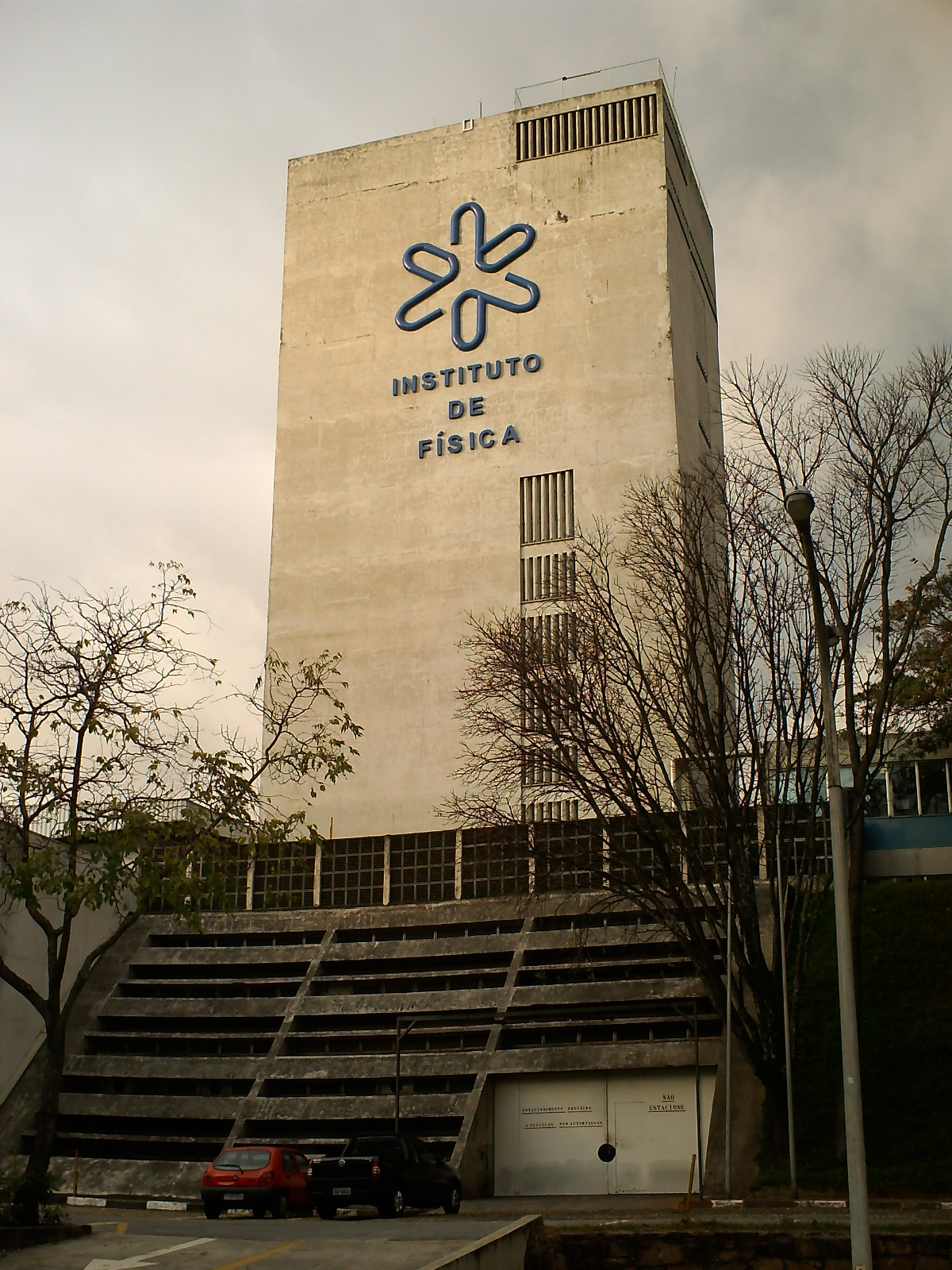
Pelletron particle accelerator tower at the Open Laboratory of Nuclear Physics.

The institute is the most complete Brazilian center in the field, covering almost all areas of physics. The technical and administrative infrastructure includes mechanical, electronic and high vacuum workshops and computer facilities. IFUSP's library is one of the most complete in the country and its current collection consists of more than 39,000 books, 3,800 dissertations and theses, 675 collections of periodicals, 400 multimedia titles, 60 publications, 30 handouts and 250 pamphlets. IFUSP operates laboratories for around 3,000 university students in the areas of engineering, exact sciences and biology, as well as scientific exhibitions for primary and secondary school students and the general public. Each year, around 65 physicists graduate with bachelor's and master's degrees, and around 40 master's and 35 doctoral graduates. About 800 research papers are published every year, more than 400 of them in specialized international journals.

Today, IFUSP is composed of six departments:

- Department of Materials Physics and Mechanics (FMT);
- Department of Mathematical Physics (FMA);
- Department of Experimental Physics (FEP);
- Department of Nuclear Physics (FNC);
- Department of Applied Physics (FAP);
- General Physics Department (FGE);

== Research areas ==
The institute has the following laboratories and research groups:

- Nuclear Physics:
  - Hadron and Theoretical Physics Group;
  - Gamma-ray Spectroscopy Group;
  - Heavy Ion Reactions Group;
  - Direct Reactions and Exotic Nuclei Group;
  - Heavy Nuclei Fusion Group;
  - Nuclear Emulsions Group;
  - Relativistic Heavy Ions Group;
  - Instrumentation and Particles Laboratory;
  - Linear Accelerator Laboratory;
- Atomic, molecular and optical physics:
  - Molecular Physics and Modeling Group;
  - Coherent Manipulation of Atoms and Light Group;
  - Optics Laboratory;
- Condensed matter:
  - Sampa Group;
  - Nanomol Group;
  - New Semiconductor Materials Laboratory;
  - Thin Film Laboratory;
  - Electron Microscopy Laboratory;
  - Magnetic Materials Laboratory;
  - Low Temperature and Solid State Laboratory;
  - Crystallography Laboratory;
- Biophysics:
  - Magnetic Resonance Laboratory;
  - Biophysics Group;
  - Cellular Rheology Laboratory;
- Applied physics:
  - Radiation Dosimetry Laboratory;
  - Ionic Crystals, Thin Films and Dating Laboratory;
  - Accelerator Applied Physics Group;
  - Ion Beam Materials Analysis Laboratory;
- Others:
  - Statistical Physics Group;
  - Mathematical Physics Group;
  - Complex Fluids Group;
  - Non-Linear Phenomena Laboratory;
  - Atmospheric Physics Laboratory;
  - Plasma Physics Laboratory;

The institute also has researchers in particle physics, cosmology, astrophysics, dynamical systems, complex systems, stochastic dynamics and physics teaching.

== Other programs ==
- Pre-Scientific Initiation: aims to contribute to the improvement of secondary education by offering high school students the chance to experience university environments;
- Scientific Initiation: a program offered to undergraduate students to introduce them to a research and development context. It is always accompanied by a supervising professor who oversees the student's work and coordinates the grants paid out by research funding agencies;
- Post-doctorate: offers post-doctorates advantages similar to those given to their graduate students. These include benefits from the university's health services, access to libraries and computer resources. Postdoctoral students from funding agencies such as FAPESP, CNPq and CAPES have access to the Postdoctoral Program and to these benefits.

== See also ==
- Faculty of Philosophy, Languages and Human Sciences, University of São Paulo
- Polytechnic School of the University of São Paulo
