= Waldyr Alves Rodrigues Jr. =

Waldyr Alves Rodrigues, Jr.
- Born: March 14, 1946; Araraquara, SP, Brazil
- Died: April 4, 2017 (aged 71); Campinas, SP, Brazil
- Education: University of São Paulo
- Known for: Research in Clifford algebras, relativistic wave equations, quantum mechanics, and relativity
- Awards: Zeferino Vaz Prize for Academic Achievement in Mathematics (1992, 1998), Paul Sabatier University Gold Medal (2012)
- Scientific career
- Fields: Physics, Mathematical Physics
- Thesis: (1971)
- Academic advisors: Mário Schenberg

Waldyr Alves Rodrigues, Jr. (March 14, 1946 – April 4, 2017) born at Araraquara, SP, Brazil, obtained his B.Sc. in physics in 1968 at the University of São Paulo (Brazil), where he has been a research student of Mário Schenberg (one of the top Brazilian theoretical physicists) and became an assistant professor in 1969. He then moved to Torino, Italy, where he did postgraduate studies at the Scuola di Perfezionamento in Fisica Nucleare and obtained a degree (equivalent to a Ph.D.) in theoretical nuclear physics in 1971. Later that year, he returned to Brazil and became an associate professor at the new Physics Institute of Campinas State University (UNICAMP).

He worked there with Cesare M. G. Lattes (one of the discoverers of the $\pi$-meson) on multiple particle production (particularly the so-called centauro events) produced by collisions of very high energy cosmic rays with the atmosphere or with target atoms. During the 1970s, he progressively moved his research interests to mathematical physics, and in 1981 he moved to the Institute of Mathematics, Statistics and Scientific Computation (IMECC-UNICAMP). There, he became a full professor of mathematical physics in 1986, until he retired in 1998; he continued to serve as an invited professor. He was the director of that institute from 1994 to 1998 and also served as vice president for the Foundation for Development of UNICAMP from 1998–2000. He used to be deputy coordinator of the Clifford Algebras International Research Open Studies, Laboratoire de Mathématiques Emile Picard, Institut de Mathématiques de Toulouse, Université Paul Sabatier, Toulouse, France and also a member of the Scientific Council of the Center of Logic, Epistemology and the History of Science (UNICAMP).

Rodrigues is well known for his diverse research interests, such as the applications of Clifford algebras, the study of extraordinary solutions of the relativistic wave equations, and the foundations of quantum mechanics and relativity; he has given several lectures on these subjects at international meetings. He advised 12 Ph.D. theses in both mathematics and physics, and published over 135 papers in leading scientific journals and dozens of chapters of books. More than a hundred of his papers are reviewed in Mathematics Reviews and the Zentrallblat für Mathematik. He serves on the editorial board of the journals Advances in Applied Clifford Algebras and Random Operators and Stochastic Equations. He was a member of the American Mathematical Society, the International Association of Mathematical Physics, Brazilian Mathematical Society, the Brazilian Society for Applied and Computational Mathematics, the Brazilian Physical Society, the New York Academy of Sciences, and the Lódz Society of Sciences. He won in 1992 and in 1998 the Zeferino Vaz Prize for Academic Achievement in Mathematics. He is the author (among others) of the books Nonlocality in Quantum Physics (with A. A. Grib) and The Many Faces of Maxwell, Dirac and Einstein Equations, A Clifford Bundle Approach (with E. Capelas de Oliveira). Rodrigues has been a visiting scientist at MIT (USA) in 1976/1978 and Visiting Professor at Trento University (1987/1988), Perugia University (1989), and Liverpool University (2001/2002). He was Editor-in-Chief of the Springer-Birkhäuser journal Advances in Applied Clifford Algebras and a member of the Russian Academy of Natural Sciences (RANS). He is a recipient of the Paul Sabatier University Gold Medal for contributions to mathematical physics.

== Prizes and distinctions ==
- Zeferino Vaz Prize of Academic Merit in Mathematics, 1992.
- Ordinary member of Lódz Society of Sciences, Polonia, since 29/05/95.
- Editor-in-Chief of the Journal "Advances in Applied Clifford Algebras".
- Member of the journal editorial board "Random Operator and Stochastic Equations".
- Member of the New York Academy of Sciences.
- Zeferino Vaz Prize of Academic Merits in Mathematics, 1998.
- Listed in several ‘Who is Who?’ since 1997.
- Gold medal of the Paul Sabatier University, 2012.

== Member of scientific societies ==
- Sociedade Brasileira de Física
- Sociedade Brasileira de Matemática Aplicada e Computacional
- Sociedade Brasileira de Matemática.
- American Mathematical Society
- New York Academy of Sciences
- Lódz Society of Sciences, Poland
- Russian Academy of Natural Sciences, Russia (Full Member)

== Books ==
- E. Recami, T. M. Karade and W. A. Rodrigues, Jr. (eds.), Recent Developments in Relativity, vol.1, Proc. of the Global Conference on Mathematical Physics. Cent. Celebrations of Niels Bohr and Hermann Weyl, held at Nagpur, India during 1987, Einstein Foundation International, Nagpur, India, 1988.
- P. Letelier and W. A. Rodrigues, Jr. (eds.), Gravitation. The Spacetime Structure. Proc. SILARG VII, World Scientific Publ. Co. (1994) (540 pages). MR 1451620. ISBN 981-02-1601-7
- J. Lawrynowicz and W. A. Rodrigues, Jr. (eds.), Generalizations of Complex Analysis and their Applications in Physics, vol 1, Proc. of a Symposium held at Warsaw and Rynia, May 30/July 1, 1994, Bull. Soc. Sci. Lódz. Sér. Rech Déform. 19, 1–139, (1995). MR 1408700
- B. Apanasov, S. Bradlow, W. A. Rodrigues Jr. and K. Uhlembeck (eds.), Geometry, Topology and Physics. Proc. First Brasil/USA Workshop, W. de Gruyter & Co., Berlin (1997) (360 pages). MR 1605264. ISBN 3-11-015594-X
- A. A. Grib and W. A. Rodrigues Jr., Nonlocality in Quantum Physics, Kluwer Academic/Plenum Publishing, New York, (1999) (222 pages). ISBN 0-306-46182-X
- Yu. N. Gnedin, A. A. Grib, V. M. Mostephanenko and W. A. Rodrigues, Jr., Proc. of the Fourth Alexander Friedmann International Seminar on Gravitation and Cosmology, St. Petersburg, Russia, IMECC-UNICAMP Publ., (1999) (480 pages). ISBN 85-87185-01-2
- E. Capelas de Oliveira and W. A. Rodrigues, Jr., Introdução às Variáveis Complexas e Aplicações, Coleção IMECC vol.1, IMECC-UNICAMP Publ., first edition (1999), second revised edition (2000), (274 pages). ISBN 85-87185-02-0
- E. Capelas de Oliveira and W. A. Rodrigues, Jr., Funções Analíticas com Aplicações, Editora da Física, São Paulo, 2006. ISBN 85-88325-53-5
- W. A. Rodrigues Jr. and E. Capelas de Oliveira, The Many Faces of Maxwell, Dirac and Einstein Equations. A Clifford Bundle Approach (445 pages), Lecture Notes in Physics 722, Springer, Heidelberg, 2007. ISBN 978-3-540-71292-3
- Virginia V. Fernández and W. A. Rodrigues Jr., Gravitation as a Plastic Distortion of the Lorentz Vacuum, Fundamental Theories of Physics 168, Springer, Heidelberg, 2010. ISBN 978-3-642-13588-0
