= Oscar Sala =

Italian-Brazilian nuclear physicist

Oscar Sala (born March 26, 1922, in Milan, Italy, d. January 2, 2010 in São Paulo, Brazil), Italian-Brazilian nuclear physicist and important scientific leader, Emeritus Professor of the Institute of Physics, University of São Paulo.

== Early life and education ==
Sala graduated in physics in 1943, at the then recently created University of São Paulo, in São Paulo, Brazil. The Department of Physics of the Faculty of Philosophy, Sciences and Letters was started with two imminent Italian physicists, Gleb Wataghin and Giuseppe Occhialini, who specialized in researching cosmic radiation. He was contemporary with a brilliant generation of young Brazilian physicians, such as César Lattes, José Leite Lopes, Mário Schenberg, Roberto Salmeron, Marcelo Damy de Souza Santos and Jayme Tiomno. While still a student, Oscar Sala started research work with the group. In 1945, Sala published with Wataghin an important paper on showers of penetrating nuclear particles.

== Career in academia ==
Soon after graduation, he was hired as a teaching assistant by the Chair of General and Experimental Physics, led by Prof. Marcelo Damy de Souza Santos. His entire scientific and teaching career was spent at the same institution, which later became the Institute of Physics. In this new capacity, Sala became head of the Department of Nuclear Physics (1970–1979 and 1983–1987).

In 1946 Oscar Sala received a scholarship from the Rockefeller Foundation and went to study in the U.S., first at the University of Illinois, and subsequently, in 1948, at the University of Wisconsin–Madison. There, he participated in the development of electrostatic particle accelerators for use in nuclear physics research, the first devices to use pulsed beams for the study of nuclear reactions with rapid neutrons. Upon his return to Brazil, Sala was responsible for installing and coordinating research efforts based on a large electrostatic Van de Graaff generator. Later, he helped to build a pelletron at the University of São Paulo (the first in Latin America).

As a scientific leader, Dr. Oscar Sala was one of the founders and a scientific director (1959–1965) with the Foundation for Support of Research of the State of São Paulo (Fundação de Amparo à Pesquisa do Estado de São Paulo (FAPESP) and president of the Brazilian Society for the Advancement of Science (Sociedade Brasileira para o Progresso da Ciência). He was a member of the Brazilian Academy of Sciences (Academia Brasileira de Ciências), the Third World Academy of Sciences and the American Academy of Arts and Sciences. Prof. Sala was a member of the Board of Sponsors of The Bulletin of the Atomic ScientistsBulletin of the Atomic Scientists.

== Selected bibliography ==
- WATAGHIN, G. and SALA, O. 1945. Showers of penetrating particles. Phys. R., vol. 67, p. 55.
- AXEL, P., GOLDHABER, M. and SALA, O. 1948. Internal conversion electrons accompanying slow neutron capture in Gd. Phys. R., vol. 74, p. 1249.
- HERB, R. G. and SALA, O. 1948. Design of electrostatic generator for the Universidade de São Paulo, Brasil. Phys. R., vol. 74, p. 1260.
- BOWER, J., GOLDHABER, M., HILL, R. D. and SALA, O. 1948. Short lived metastable state of an "Even-Even" nucleus Ge72. Phys. R., vol. 73, p. 1219.
- ACQUADRO, J. C., HUSSEIN, M. S., PEREIRA, D. and SALA, O. 1981. The contribution of quasi-elastic processes to the total reaction cross-section of heavy ions. Physical Review Letters., vol. B100, p. 381.
- SALA, O. 1982. Post-accelerator for the Pelletron of the University of São Paulo. Workshop on Nuclear Physics, 5., La Plata, Argentina:.
