= Henrique Lins de Barros =

Brazilian polymath (1947–2025)

- Born: Henrique Gomes da Paiva Lins de Barros; May 30, 1947; Rio de Janeiro, Brazil
- Died: September 28, 2025 (aged 78)
- Education: PUC-RJ
- Occupations: Biophysicist writer biographer
- Years active: 1964–2025
- Employer: Centro Brasileiro de Pesquisas Físicas
- Known for: Was one of the main researchers on Alberto Santos Dumont
- Spouse: Myriam Moraes Lins de Barros
- Children: 3
- Parents: Henry British Lins de Barros Pessoa (father); Eurydice Gomes de Paiva Lins de Barros (mother)
- Relatives: João Alberto Lins de Barros (uncle)
- Awards: Order of Aeronautical Merit; Santos-Dumont Merit Medal; National Order of Scientific Merit

Henrique Gomes de Paiva Lins de Barros (May 30, 1947 – September 28, 2025) was a Brazilian physicist, biophysicist, writer, science communicator specialist, musician, screenwriter, painter and poet.

== Early life ==
Lins de Barros was born on May 30, 1947. His parents were Henry British (a Navy official) and Eurydice Gomes de Paiva Lins de Barros. His father and uncles participated in the creation of the Centro Brasileiro de Pesquisas Físicas (CBPF), along with César Lattes, one of the founding members and a friend of the Lins de Barros family. Raised in Copacabana in an apartment "where we almost couldn't see the sky", he and his brothers developed an interest in airplanes and learned to recognize them by their sound.

== Career ==
In 1964, Lins de Barros began studying engineering at the Fluminense Federal University, switching after eighteen months to physics at PUC-RJ before graduating in 1970. During this time, he began creating music as a hobby. He received a master's degree in atomic theory in 1973, and also worked as a teacher there.

He earned a doctorate in Physics from the Brazilian Center for Research in Physics in 1978 and served as its director from Museu de Astronomia e Ciências Afins, 1992–2000. In 1989, he developed an exposition about 20th-century scientific questions. At the CBPF, he worked in the field of biophysics, and a joint investigation with UFRJ resulted in the discovery of a multicellular bacterium.

His research interests include atomic physics, biophysics, the history of science and technology. He considered himself an experimentalist rather than a theorist.

=== Science communication ===
Lins de Barros began as a science communicator during the Brazilian military dictatorship in the 1980s and participated in conferences. Unable to balance his academic work with his science communication efforts, he discontinued his scholarly work.

=== Santos-Dumont ===
Lins de Barros was considered an expert on the life and work of Alberto Santos Dumont, having written four books about the Brazilian aviator and is considered a reference in Brazil and worldwide. His interest in Santos Dumont began in the 1980s when he saw a replica of the 1909 Demoiselle. He began researching Dumont and his plane, aiming to create a small-scale replica for himself. He also disputed the notion that the Wright Brothers invented the airplane, asserting that the controversy in Brazil reflects a failure of Brazilian science communication. According to him, political pressure favors discussing the Wrights, and a clear campaign occurred in the late 1930s on behalf of the Americans, despite it lacking "any historical basis," because the brothers never "understood what it is to takeoff," according to the researcher.

With CNPq investment, he traveled to France in 1985 to research Santos Dumont for a film project by Tizuka Yamasaki. Compiling the data, he wrote his first book, "Santos-Dumont," in 1986. The movie was ultimately scrapped due to budget constraints, but he was the screenwriter and composer of the Nelson Hoineff documentary, "O homem pode voar" (2003).

In 2005, he participated in the construction of a 14-bis replica by Alan Calassa. In 2014, he took office as chief of the Museum of Environment.

== Death ==
Lins de Barros died on September 28, 2025, at the age of 78.

== Awards ==
For his research on Santos Dumont, Henrique Lins de Barros was awarded the Order of Aeronautical Merit as Grand-Officer on October 23, 2007. He also received the Santos-Dumont Merit Medal and the National Order of Scientific Merit, Medalha 20 anos da Ciência Hoje.

== Works ==
Partial listing:

- Lins de Barros, Henrique Gomes de Paiva. Santos Dumont: o homem voa! Rio de Janeiro: Contraponto, 2000.

__________. Santos Dumont e a invenção do vôo. Rio de Janeiro: Jorge Zahar Editor, 2003.

- Lins de Barros, Henrique (2006). Santos-Dumont e a Invenção do Avião (PDF) (in Brazilian Portuguese). Rio de Janeiro: CBPF. p. 20. ISBN 85-85752-16-5. Archived from the original (PDF) on April 27, 2021.

__________. Desafio de voar. São Paulo: Metalivros, 2006.

Translations

- Lins de Barros, Henrique (2006). Santos-Dumont and the Invention of the Airplane (PDF). Translated by Maria Cristina Ramalho Ardoy. Rio de Janeiro: CBPF. p. 24. ISBN 85-85752-17-3. Archived from the original (PDF) on April 27, 2021.
- Lins de Barros, Henrique (2006). Santos-Dumont Y La Invención del Avión (PDF) (in Spanish). Translated by Carlos Alberto Ardoy. Rio de Janeiro: CBPF. p. 24. ISBN 85-85752-18-1. Archived from the original (PDF) on April 27, 2021.
