= José Leite Lopes =

Brazilian theoretical physicist

- Born: October 28, 1918; Recife, Pernambuco, Brazil
- Died: June 12, 2006 (aged 87); Rio de Janeiro, Brazil
- Education: University of São Paulo; Federal University of Rio de Janeiro
- Known for: Z0 bosons
- Awards: UNESCO Science Prize; Brazilian Order of Scientific Merit
- Scientific career
- Fields: Theoretical physics
- Doctoral advisor: Wolfgang Pauli, Mário Schenberg

José Leite Lopes (October 28, 1918 – June 12, 2006) was a Brazilian theoretical physicist who worked in the field of quantum field theory and particle physics.

== Life ==
Leite Lopes began his university studies in 1935, enrolling in industrial chemistry at the Chemistry School of Pernambuco. In 1937, while presenting a paper to a scientific conference in Rio de Janeiro, the young student met Brazilian physicist Mário Schenberg and was introduced by him in São Paulo to Italian physicists Luigi Fantappiè and Gleb Wataghin. All three were working on research in physics at the then recently created University of São Paulo, amid a climate of great intellectual excitement and a breeding ground for a bright young generation of what would become the élite of Brazilian physics, such as César Lattes, Oscar Sala, Roberto Salmeron, Jayme Tiomno and Marcelo Damy de Souza Santos. Encouraged to study physics by what he saw, Leite Lopes moved to Rio de Janeiro after hist graduation in 1939. He took the entrance examinations to the National Faculty of Philosophy of the University of Brazil in 1940 and graduated a bachelor in physics in 1942. Accepting an invitation by Carlos Chagas Filho, Leite Lopes started to work in the same year the Institute of Biophysics of the Federal University of Rio de Janeiro, but soon moved to the University of São Paulo to take up graduate studies in quantum mechanics with his teacher, friend and sponsor, Mário Schenberg. His main work during this time was on the calculation of Dirac's radiation field of electrons. In 1944, Leite Lopes got an American fellowship to study at Princeton University, in New Jersey, United States, under Josef-Maria Jauch. There, he had the opportunity to learn and work with giants of theoretical physics, such as Albert Einstein, Wolfgang Pauli and John von Neumann, despite the fact that most of the faculty was absent, involved in the Manhattan Project (the development of the first atomic bombs). In 1946, he finished his doctoral dissertation, on the topic of the influence of the recoil of heavy particles on the nuclear potential energy, and returned to Rio de Janeiro. He accepted the interim chair of Theoretical and Superior Physics at the University of Brazil, and started to lecture on quantum mechanics and quantum theory of radiation. In 1948 he was confirmed as chairman after presenting a thesis on the theory of nuclear forces.

Together with César Lattes, a young physicist from São Paulo who had achieved international fame due to his co-discovery of a new kind of nuclear particle, the pion (pi-meson), Leite Lopes was instrumental in creating in January 1949, in Rio de Janeiro, the Centro Brasileiro de Pesquisas Físicas (Brazilian Center for Research in Physics) (CBPF), a research center in theoretical physics (the first in Latin America), maintained by funds from Confederação Nacional de Indústrias (Brazilian Confederation of Industries), then presided by Euvaldo Lodi. In the same year Leite Lopes was invited by Robert Oppenheimer to spend another year of study at the Institute for Advanced Study in Princeton, where he attended lectures by Richard Feynman, Victor Weisskopf and Paul Dirac. In 1957 he again visited the US on a fellowship, by invitation of Richard Feynman, at the California Institute of Technology.

In 1969, the new military regime in Brazil took away his political rights, together with several other professors, supposedly on the basis of his participation in a "communist conspiracy". He was dismissed summarily from the very Center he had created and exiled himself voluntarily in the USA (at the Carnegie Mellon University) but after evidence of USA collaboration with the 1964 military coup was manifest he went to Université Louis Pasteur, in Strasbourg, France. From 1974 to 1978, Leite Lopes was appointed full professor with the Université Louis Pasteur, taking up the directorship of the Division of High Energy and the position of vice-director of the Centre de Recherches Nucléaires, a part of the Centre National de la Recherche Scientifique (CNRS). He returned to Brazil in 1986, as the director of the Centro Brasileiro de Pesquisas Físicas. He was also an honorary president of the Brazilian Society for the Advancement of Science.

Among many international and national honors and prizes, Leite Lopes received the 1999 UNESCO Science Prize and received the Great Cross of the Brazilian Order of Scientific Merit.

== Works ==
Leite Lopes is internationally recognized for his many contributions to theoretical physics, particularly in the following areas:

- Prediction of the existence of neutral vectorial bosons (Z0 boson), in 1958, by devising an equation which showed the analogy of the weak nuclear interactions with electromagnetism. Steven Weinberg, Sheldon Glashow and Abdus Salam used later these results to develop the electroweak unification. They were awarded with the Nobel Prize of Physics in 1979.
- The vector dominance model in nuclear electroweak interactions
- Nuclear shell structure in photonuclear reactions
- Construction of the Fock relativistic space
- Meson pseudoscalar potential in deuteron theory
- Scalar meson pairs
- Models of lepton and quark structures
