= Nussenzweig =

Nussenzweig or Nussenzveig is a surname of German origin. Notable people with the surname include:

== Nussenzweig ==
- Michel C. Nussenzweig (born 1955), American biologist
- Ruth Sonntag Nussenzweig (1928–2018), Austrian-Brazilian immunologist

== Nussenzveig ==
- Helena J. Nussenzveig Lopes, Brazilian mathematician
- Herch Moysés Nussenzveig (1933–2022), Brazilian physicist
