= Maria Laura Moura Mouzinho Leite Lopes =

Brazilian mathematician

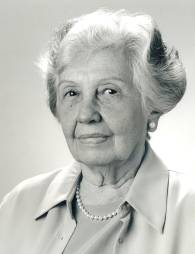
- Born: January 18, 1917; Timbaúba, Pernambuco
- Died: June 20, 2013 (aged 96); Rio de Janeiro, Rio de Janeiro
- Education: National Faculty of Philosophy (FNFi)
- Known for: First Brazilian woman PhD in mathematics
- Spouse: José Leite Lopes
- Scientific career
- Fields: Mathematics
- Workplaces: Brazilian Center for Research in Physics (CBPF), Aeronautics Institute of Technology (ITA), National Institute for Pure and Applied Mathematics (IMPA)
- Patrons: António Aniceto Ribeiro Monteiro, Cesar Lattes

Notes
- Father: Oscar Mouzinho Mother: Laura Moura Mouzinho

Maria Laura Moura Mouzinho Leite Lopes or Maria Laura Mouzinho Leite Lopes or Maria Laura Lopes (Timbaúba, October 18, 1917 – Rio de Janeiro, June 20, 2013) was a Brazilian mathematician, the first Brazilian woman PhD in mathematics, specializing in Mathematics education.

A renowned mathematician, she fought the dictatorship and articulated the creation of research institutions. She was part of the group that articulated the foundation of the Brazilian Center for Research in Physics (CBPF), an institute she created together with José Leite Lopes and César Lattes in 1949. In addition, she participated in articulations to found other important institutions, such as the National Council for Scientific and Technological Development (CNPq), the National Institute for Pure and Applied Mathematics (IMPA) and the Brazilian Society for Mathematics Education (SBEM).

== Personal life ==
Maria Laura was born in the Zona da Mata of Pernambuco state, on January 18, 1917. Daughter of Laura Moura Mouzinho and Oscar Mouzinho, a self-taught merchant. Her parents encouraged their children's education, and Maria Laura began her school life at the João Barbalho School Group in Recife, graduating in 1931.

== Career ==
In 1932, she entered the Escola Normal de Pernambuco, studying until 1934, where she was a student of teacher Luiz de Barros Freire (1986–1963). According to Maria Laura, he was responsible for her vocation in mathematics. In 1935, the family moved to Rio de Janeiro, where she enrolled in the La-Fayette Institute. In 1939 she entered the Mathematics course at the University of the Federal District (Universidade do Distrito Federal - UDF), but had only 15 days of classes, because the university was extinguished by the Federal Decree No. 1.063/39. Professors and students were transferred to the Mathematics course of the newly created National Faculty of Philosophy (Faculdade Nacional de Filosofia – FNFi).

Maria Laura received her bachelor's degree in mathematics in 1941. In 1942 she received her licentiate degree, and in 1949 she obtained her PhD in mathematics, being the first woman to obtain this title in Brazil. Before obtaining her doctorate, she was already an assistant professor in the Mathematics Department of the FNFi, participating in the creation of the CBPF, together with César Lattes (1924–2005) and José Leite Lopes (1918–2006), in 1949. In the same year, she taught Geometry in the Engineering course of the newly created Aeronautics Institute of Technology (Instituto Tecnológico da Aeronáutica – ITA) and worked, in the United States, at the Department of Mathematics of the University of Chicago.

In 1952, she founded the IMPA, together with professor Cândido Lima da Silva Dias (1913–1998). In March of the same year, she was graduated in the Brazilian Academy of Sciences (Academia Brasileira de Ciências – ABC).

She married in 1956 to the renowned physicist and professor José Leite Lopes. In 1961 she was appointed professor of the Technical Professional Education of the State of Guanabara and in 1967, she assumed the head of the Mathematics Department of the FNFi, until it became the Institute of Mathematics of the UFRJ.

== Exile ==
In 1969, by Institutional Act Number Five (AI-5), she and her husband were exiled and banned from Brazil. The couple left for France, where Maria Laura began her research in Mathematics Education at the Institute for Research in Mathematics Education (Institute de Recherche en Enseignement de Mathematiques). She returned to Brazil only in 1974, already with international experience, and was invited to be the Mathematics coordinator at the Eliezer Eistenbarg Brazilian Jewish School. In 1976, she took part in the foundation of the Group for Teaching and Research in Mathematics Education (Grupo de Ensino e Pesquisa em Educação Matemática – GEPEM), which was chaired by Maria Laura during the first eight years. She coordinated the first research in Mathematics Education in Brazil, the "Teacher-Student Binomial Project in the Initiation to Mathematics Education – an experimental research" (Projeto Binômio Professor-Aluno na Iniciação à Educação Matemática – uma pesquisa experimental).

== Return to Brazil ==
After the Amnesty Law in 1979, still under military rule, Maria Laura resumed her professorship at the Mathematics Institute at UFRJ. In 1981 she and a group of teachers developed the research project "Evaluation of students at the end of the 4th grade in public schools" (Avaliação dos alunos no final da 4ª série primária das escolas públicas) in the city of Rio de Janeiro, and in 1982 she joined the Ministry of Education's "Program for Integration of the University with Primary Education" (Programa de Integração da Universidade com o Ensino do 1º Grau). She did several research projects for the federal and state governments on Mathematics education in the country, trying to identify the deficiencies in schools and in teacher training.

In 1980, the first lato sensu post-graduate course in Mathematics Education in Brazil was created, followed by master's and doctorate levels. In 1988, she founded the Brazilian Mathematics Education Society (Sociedade Brasileira de Educação Matemática – SBEM), along with other professors and researchers in the field.

== Retirement and death ==
On July 1, 1996, after 65 years of teaching and research career, she received the title of professor emeritus from the Federal University of Rio de Janeiro (UFRJ). Her work is now a reference worldwide, with several articles and books published.

Member of the ABC, Maria Laura died on June 20, 2013.

== See also ==
- Brazilian Center for Research in Physics (CBPF)
- National Council for Scientific and Technological Development (CNPq)
- Instituto Nacional de Matemática Pura e Aplicada (IMPA)
- List of women in mathematics
- Association for Women in Mathematics
- Timeline of women in mathematics worldwide
- Women in science
