= Katemari Rosa =

Brazilian physicist

Katemari Diogo da Rosa is a Brazilian physicist, a professor in the Institute of Physics of the Federal University of Bahia, and the secretary for educational affairs of the Brazilian Physical Society. Rosa is Black and lesbian; her research focuses on intersectional issues of gender and ethnicity in physics and physics education.

== Education and career ==
Rosa is originally from Porto Alegre; her interest in physics and astronomy started already at age 8. She went to a technical high school on the campus of the Federal University of Rio Grande do Sul, next door to a planetarium, and started her studies in physics aiming to become an astrophysicist. As she studied more, her interests shifted to physics education. She received a licenciate in physics education at the Federal University of Rio Grande do Sul in 2002, working there with Maria Helena Steffani, and in 2006 received a master's degree in the education, philosophy, and history of science through the Federal University of Bahia. Her master's thesis studied the incorporation of the history and philosophy of science into physics teacher training, and was supervised by Maria Cristina Mesquita Martins.

After two years as a visiting professor at the State University of Feira de Santana, from 2006 to 2008, she continued her studies in science education at Columbia University in the US, receiving a second master's degree in 2010 and receiving her doctorate in 2013. Her doctoral dissertation, Gender, ethnicity, and physics education: Understanding how Black women build their identities as scientists, was advised by Felicia Moore Mensah of Teachers College, Columbia University. Returning to Brazil, she became an assistant professor at the Federal University of Campina Grande from 2013 to 2017. She moved to her present position at the Federal University of Bahia in 2017.

== Recognition ==
Rosa was a 2020 nominee for the Yes Award for Racial Equality of the Instituto Identidades do Brasil, in the category of Black intellectuality.

She was named as a Fellow of the American Physical Society (APS) in 2024, after a nomination from the APS Forum on Education, "for dedication to improving physics education globally through research, curriculum development, and fostering international collaborations, and for work on decolonizing physics education to better serve marginalized people".
