= Waldyr =

Waldyr is a given name. Notable people with the given name include:

- Waldyr Geraldo Boccardo (1936–2018), Brazilian basketball player
- Waldyr Calheiros Novaes (1923–2013), Brazilian Roman Catholic bishop
- Waldyr Igayara de Souza (1934–2002), Brazilian comic book artist and editor
- Waldyr Pereira (1928–2001), known professionally as Didi, Brazilian footballer
- Waldyr Alves Rodrigues Jr. (1946–2017), Brazilian physicist
