= Marcelo Damy =

Brazilian physicist (1914–2009)

Marcelo Damy de Sousa Santos (July 14, 1914 – November 29, 2009) was a Brazilian physicist.

Considered as one of the most important educators and researchers in physics in Brazil, along with Cesar Lattes, José Leite Lopes and Mario Schenberg, Damy was born in Campinas, São Paulo, in 1914, the son of Harald Egydio de Souza Santos a photographer, and Maria Luiza Damy de Souza Santos. He did his secondary studies in the State Gymnasium (later to be called Colégio Culto à Ciência) and was a keen student of sciences, particularly physics and chemistry.

In 1932, he was admitted to the Polytechnic School of the University of São Paulo to study electrical engineering, but eventually switched to physics at the invitation of Prof. Gleb Wataghin, a Russian physicist who was teaching at the time in the university, whose classes Damy enjoyed to listen, although they were given in a different course from his. He graduated in the first class of the course of physics at USP.

During his undergraduate years, Damy became interested in radioactivity. This interest started his successful lifelong career in experimental nuclear physics. After graduation, he went to Cambridge University, at 24, with a grant from the British Council, under the supervision of Prof. William L. Bragg (Nobel Prize in Physics). In England he became friends with Edmundo Barbosa da Silva, Oxford University student and future colleague in the Atomic Energy Commission of the Brazilian National Research Council. Back in Brazil, Damy worked as a research scientist for the Brazilian Navy, especially in the development of a sonar, working in a laboratory on the premises of the department of physics at the USP Faculty of Philosophy, Science and Letters until the end of World War II (1945). For this important work he received the Brazilian Medal of Naval Merit.

In 1945, at the invitation of the Rockefeller Foundation, Damy spent nine months at the University of Illinois. where he worked with Prof. Donald William Kerst, inventor of the betatron. Returning once again to Brazil, Damy accepted an assistant professorship at the Department of Physics of USP, and helped install there in 1950 a betatron, the first particle accelerator operating in Latin America. He also developed and installed the first nuclear reactor in Brazil, still in working order today. Another area of research of Damy was cosmic rays, particularly aimed at assessing the nature of the penetrating showers of cosmic rays. He demonstrated that these showers had atomic particles such as mesons, which had a great penetrating power without losing considerably part of its energy. Along with Gleb Wataghin and Paulus Aulus Pompéia he found that these showers are more energetic than previously supposed. This work was published internationally.

Damy was one of the greatest scientific leaders in Brazil, helping to found many important research and educational institutions in his area. He was a founder of the Institute of Atomic Energy and the Institute of Research on Nuclear Energy (IPEN), and its first superintendent, from 1956 to 1961. He was also president of the National Commission of Nuclear Energy (CNEN) from 1961 to 1964.

After retiring as professor emeritus from USP in 1968, Damy helped to consolidate the newly established State University of Campinas (Unicamp) and took over as director of the Institute of Physics, which received the name of his former professor, Gleb Wataghin. Furthermore, he worked as a professor of nuclear physics at the Pontifical Catholic University of São Paulo (PUC-SP) and, since 1988, collaborated again in research work done at IPEN. He authored over 80 papers and was a member of several scientific societies in Brazil and abroad, with emphasis on the Brazilian Academy of Sciences.

He married Lucia Toledo de Souza Santos in 1947.

Damy died on November 29, 2009, from complications of a stroke.

== Quote ==
"A good teacher is a researcher who likes to tell the things he does and sees others doing. I do not know any good teacher who was not, or isn't yet, a researcher".
