= Urca Casino =

Former Brazilian casino

Coordinates: 22.948359°S 43.163228°W

- Cassino da Urca
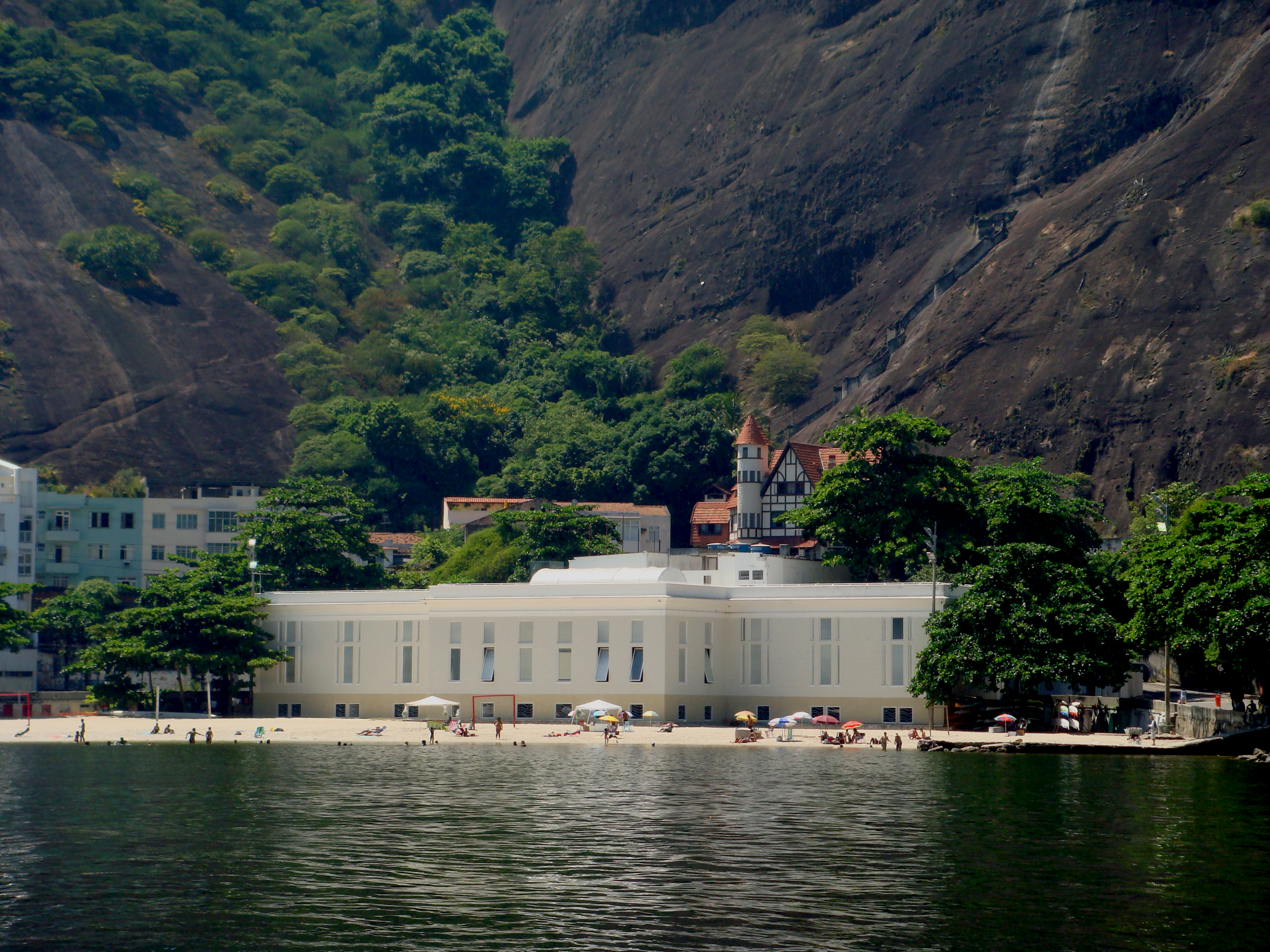
- Urca's old Casino building, re-designed by the Istituto Europeo di Design in 2010

- Location within Rio de Janeiro
- Location: Urca, Rio de Janeiro, Brazil
- Type: Casino

The Urca Casino was an internationally renowned Brazilian casino located in Urca, a neighborhood of Rio de Janeiro. It operated from 1933 to 1946, when gambling was banned.

== History ==
The building was built in 1922, initially housing the Balneário Hotel. It became a casino in 1933 and went through a period of adaptations and low attendance until businessman Joaquim Rolla won some of its shares in a card game. From then on, the Urca Casino experienced a boom and operated until 1946, when gambling was banned by President Dutra. The Urca process in nuclear astrophysics is named after the casino, where George Gamow and Mário Schenberg first proposed its existence.

From 1954 to 1980, after being purchased by Diários Associados, the building was adapted to accommodate TV Tupi's studios. Following decades of abandonment and deterioration, the beachside of the old Casino was restored by the Istituto Europeo di Design (IED) for its headquarters in Rio de Janeiro, where it operated from 2013 to 2021.

In 2023, the building was converted into the Eleva Urca School - which won the government process in 2020 to take over the space. The school is expected to welcome 300 students and the façade - which has kept the walls of the original building - has been renovated, as well as the entire inner floor.
