= Brazilian Journal of Physics =

- Discipline: Physics
- Language: English
- Edited by: Alberto Saa

Publication details
- Former name: Revista Brasileira de Física
- History: 1971-present
- Publisher: Springer Science+Business Media
- Frequency: Bimonthly
- Impact factor: 1.7 (2024)

Standard abbreviations
- ISO 4: Braz. J. Phys.

Indexing
- CODEN: BJPHE6
- ISSN: 0103-9733 (print); 1678-4448 (web)
- LCCN: 94646133
- OCLC no.: 46987831

Links
- Journal homepage

The Brazilian Journal of Physics is a bimonthly peer-reviewed scientific journal covering all areas of physics. It is the official journal of the Brazilian Physical Society and is published on their behalf by Springer Science+Business Media. The journal was established in 1971 as the Revista Brasileira de Física, obtaining its current title in 1992. The editor-in-chief is Alberto Saa (University of Campinas).

Besides four regular issues per year, the journal presents special issues focused on hot topics which are particularly well studied in Brazil.

== Abstracting and indexing ==
The journal is abstracted and indexed in Chemical Abstracts Service, Current Contents/Physical, Chemical and Earth Sciences, INSPEC, Science Citation Index, and Scopus. According to the Journal Citation Reports, the journal has a 2024 impact factor of 1.7.
