= Advances in Applied Clifford Algebras =

- Discipline: Mathematics, applied mathematics
- Language: English
- Edited by: Uwe Kähler

Publication details
- History: 1991–present
- Publisher: Birkhäuser Verlag
- Frequency: Quarterly
- Impact factor: 1.072 (2020)

Standard abbreviations
- ISO 4: Adv. Appl. Clifford Algebras
- MathSciNet: Adv. Appl. Clifford Algebr.

Indexing
- ISSN: 0188-7009 (print); 1661-4909 (web)

Links
- Journal homepage

Advances in Applied Clifford Algebras is a peer-reviewed scientific journal that publishes original research papers and also notes, expository and survey articles, book reviews, reproduces abstracts and also reports on conferences and workshops in the area of Clifford algebras and their applications to other branches of mathematics and physics, and in certain cognate areas. There is a vibrant and interdisciplinary community around Clifford and Geometric Algebras with a wide range of applications. The main conferences in this subject include The International Conference on Clifford Algebras and Their Applications in Mathematical Physics (ICCA) and Applications of Geometric Algebra in Computer Science and Engineering (AGACSE) series.

The journal was established in 1991 by Jaime Keller who was its editor-in-chief until his death in 2011. The second editor-in-chief of the journal was Waldyr Alves Rodrigues Jr. (Universidade Estadual de Campinas), and the current editor-in-chief is Uwe Kähler from University of Aveiro. The journal is published by Springer Science+Business Media under its Birkhäuser Verlag imprint.
