= Gleb Wataghin =

Italian physicist (1899–1986)

- Гліб Васильович Ватагін, Глеб Васильевич Ватагин
- Gleb Wataghin in the 1970s
- Born: Гліб Васильович Ватагін, Глеб Васильевич Ватагин; November 3, 1899; Birzula, Russian Empire (now Podilsk, Odesa Region, Ukraine)
- Died: October 10, 1986 (aged 86); Turin, Italy
- Education: University of St. Volodymyr, University of Turin
- Scientific career
- Doctoral students: Gian Carlo Wick; Sergio Fubini

Gleb Wataghin (November 3, 1899 in Birzula, Russian Empire, now Podilsk, Odesa Region, Ukraine – October 10, 1986 in Turin, Italy) was an Italian theoretical and experimental physicist and a great scientific leader who gave a great impulse to the teaching and research on physics in two continents: in the University of São Paulo, São Paulo, Brazil; and in the University of Turin, Turin, Italy.

Wataghin received his secondary education at the First Gymnasium in Kyiv, where he was a classmate of Ivan Bulgakov, the younger brother of Mikhail Bulgakov. In 1918, he graduated from the gymnasium and entered the University of St. Volodymyr in Kyiv then in Ukrainian People's Republic.

Wataghin and his family emigrated to Italy in 1920. Between 1922 and 1924 he graduates in Physics first and then in Mathematics at the University of Turin. He gives courses at the Application School of Artillery and Engineering, at the Polytechnic School and at the University of Turin. He obtains the Italian citizenship in 1929.

Wataghin engaged in 1934 with other European physicists in a big project of creation of a new Department of Physics of the recently founded University of São Paulo. He stayed in Brazil until 1948. There, he was the tutor of a group of young physicists, such as César Lattes, Oscar Sala, Mário Schenberg, Roberto Salmeron, Marcelo Damy de Souza Santos and Jayme Tiomno. The Institute of Physics of the State University of Campinas, in Campinas, Brazil, was named in his honour, as well as a prize in Physics. In 1955, he received an honorary doctorate from the University of São Paulo.

Wataghin obtains the chair of Experimental Physics in Turin in 1949. He was awarded the Feltrinelli Prize in 1951 and was national member of the Accademia Nazionale dei Lincei, from 1960.

== Selected bibliography ==
- Wataghin, Gleb (1948-01-01). "On the Formation of Chemical Elements Inside the Stars". Physical Review. 73 (1). American Physical Society (APS): 79. Bibcode:1948PhRv...73...79W. doi:10.1103/physrev.73.79. ISSN 0031-899X.
- Wataghin, Gleb (1943-02-01). "Thermal Equilibrium Between Elementary Particles". Physical Review. 63 (3–4). American Physical Society (APS): 137. Bibcode:1943PhRv...63..137W. doi:10.1103/physrev.63.137. ISSN 0031-899X.
