= Herch Moysés Nussenzveig =

Brazilian physicist (1933–2022)

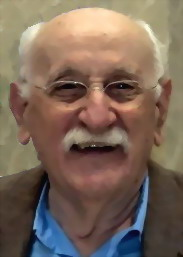
Nussenzveig

Herch Moysés Nussenzveig (16 January 1933 – 5 November 2022) was a Brazilian physicist, professor at Universidade Federal do Rio de Janeiro and member of the Brazilian Academy of Sciences of Jewish Descent. He authored several textbooks, notably the collection Curso de Física Básica (Course of Basic Physics), winner of the Prêmio Jabuti in 1999 on the category Ciências Exatas, Tecnologia e Informática (Exact Sciences, Technology and Informatics). He was president of the Brazilian Physical Society from 1981 to 1983.

Nussenzveig was born in São Paulo on 16 January 1933. He was a PhD student of Guido Beck. He was known, among other things, for explaining effects such as the glory, an optical phenomenon.

In 1986, he was the recipient of the Max Born Award. The prize citation reads: "For distinguished and valuable contributions to the theory of Mie scattering and to the theories of the rainbow and the glory."

His two brothers, wife, and three children are all scientists or physicians; one of his children is the mathematician Helena J. Nussenzveig Lopes. Nussenzveig died on 5 November 2022, at the age of 89.

Preceded by Mário Schenberg	President of the Brazilian Society of Physics; 1981–1983	Succeeded by Fernando de Souza Barros
