= Sanford–Wang parameterisation =

The Sanford–Wang parameterisation is an empirical formula used to model the production of pions in nuclear interaction of the form p+A → $\pi^+$+X where a beam of high-energy protons hit a material.

Its formula for the double-differential cross section with respect to momentum (p) and solid angle ($\Omega$) is as follows.

$\frac{d^2\sigma(p+A\rightarrow \pi^+ + X)}{dpd\Omega}(p,\theta) =$ $c_1 p^{c_2} \left(1-\frac{p}{p_{beam}}\right)\exp\left[-c_3\frac{p^{c_4}}{p_{beam}^{c_5}}-c_6\theta(p-c_7 p_{beam} (\cos\theta)^{c_8})\right]$

Where p and $\theta$ are the momentum of the outgoing pion and its angle from the direction of the incident proton. The numbers $c_1\ldots c_8$ are the Sanford-Wang parameters and are typically varied to give a good fit with experimental data.
