= Urca process =

Phenomenon in astroparticle physics

In astroparticle physics, an Urca process is a reaction which emits a neutrino and which is assumed to take part in cooling processes in neutron stars and white dwarfs. The process was first discussed by George Gamow and Mário Schenberg while they were visiting a casino named Cassino da Urca in Urca, Rio de Janeiro. Gamow wrote in his autobiography that the name was chosen in part to commemorate the gambling establishment where the two physicists had first met, and "partially because the Urca Process results in a rapid disappearance of thermal energy from the interior of a star, similar to the rapid disappearance of money from the pockets of the gamblers on the Casino de Urca." In Gamow's South Russian dialect, urca (Russian: урка) can also mean a robber or gangster.

The direct Urca processes are the simplest neutrino-emitting processes and are thought to be central in the cooling of neutron stars. They have the general form

B_{1}			→	B_{2}	+	ℓ	+	ν̅_{l},
B_{2}	+	ℓ	→	B_{1}	+	ν_{l},

where B_{1} and B_{2} are baryons, ℓ is a lepton, and ν_{l} (and ν̅_{l}) are (anti-)neutrinos. The baryons can be nucleons (free or bound), hyperons like Λ, Σ and Ξ, or members of the Δ isobar. The lepton is either an electron or a muon.

The Urca process is especially important in the cooling of white dwarfs, where a lepton (usually an electron) is absorbed by the nucleus of an ion and then convectively carried away from the core of a star. Then, a beta decay occurs. Convection then carries the element back into the interior of the star, and the cycle repeats many times. Because the neutrinos emitted during this process are unlikely to be reabsorbed, this is effectively a cooling mechanism for white dwarfs.

The process can also be essential in the cooling of neutron stars. If a neutron star contains a central core in which the direct Urca-process is operative, the cooling timescale shortens by many orders of magnitude.
