= Hugh Muirhead =

British nuclear physicist (1925–2007)

Hugh Muirhead (1925 – 19 January 2007) was a British nuclear physicist and the last surviving author of the scientific paper announcing the discovery of the pion, a particle predicted by Hideki Yukawa.

Muirhead did his PhD studies at the University of Bristol, where he, César Lattes and Giuseppe Occhialini, were part of Cecil Powell's group trying to confirm the existence of pions. Evidence was eventually found on 7 March 1947 by two of the group's technical team, Marietta Kurz and Irene Roberts. A paper was submitted to the journal Nature and published the same year. In 1950, Powell was awarded the Nobel Prize for the discovery.

After gaining his PhD, Muirhead moved to the University of Glasgow and then the University of Liverpool in 1957, where he spent the rest of his career. Under his direction at Liverpool, it was experimentally confirmed that parity was violated in muon capture. He became a world authority on antiproton physics. As well as dozens of scientific papers, his textbooks include The Physics of Elementary Particles and Notes on Elementary Particle Physics (based on a series of his series of lectures), running into many editions. In 1973 and 1974, he ran summer schools for high-energy physics students at the Rutherford Appleton Laboratory. In the 1980s, he joined the UA1 group at CERN, led by Carlo Rubbia and Alan Astbury, studying proton-antiproton collisions; Astbury had been Muirhead's former student at Liverpool. Their work led to a Nobel Prize for Rubbia and Simon van der Meer.

Muirhead died aged 81, survived by his wife, Jean, and three children.

== Books published ==
- The Physics of Elementary Particles, Oxford/New York, Pergamon Press. (1965)
- Notes on Elementary Particle Physics, Oxford/New York, Pergamon Press. (1971)
- The Special Theory of Relativity, New York, Wiley. (1973)
