= C. F. Powell =

British physicist (1903–1969)

Cecil Powell FRS
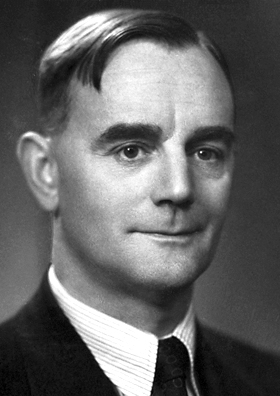
- Powell in 1950
- Born: Cecil Frank Powell; 5 December 1903; Tonbridge, England
- Died: 9 August 1969 (aged 65); Casargo, Italy
- Education: University of Cambridge (BA, PhD)
- Known for: Discovery of the pion
- Spouse: Isobel Therese Artner (m. 1932)
- Children: 2
- Awards: Hughes Medal (1949); Nobel Prize in Physics (1950); Royal Medal (1961); Lomonosov Gold Medal (1967)
- Scientific career
- Fields: Physics
- Workplaces: University of Bristol
- Doctoral advisors: Ernest Rutherford; C. T. R. Wilson
- Notable students: Peter Fowler; Michael W. Friedlander; M. G. K. Menon

Cecil Frank Powell (5 December 1903 – 9 August 1969) was a British experimental physicist who received the Nobel Prize in Physics in 1950 for heading the team that developed the photographic method of studying nuclear processes, and for the resulting discovery of the pion (pi-meson).

== Biography ==
Cecil Frank Powell was born on 5 December 1903 in Tonbridge, England, the son of Elizabeth Caroline (née Bisacre) and Frank Powell, a gunsmith. His father came from a family that had long-practised gunsmithing in Tonbridge, while his mother was a descendant of Huguenots that left France and settled in the Cotswolds.

Powell was educated at a local primary school, before gaining a scholarship to The Judd School. He entered Sidney Sussex College, Cambridge, also on scholarship, graduating in 1925 with first-class honours in the Natural Sciences Tripos. He then worked under Ernest Rutherford and C. T. R. Wilson in the Cavendish Laboratory, and received a Doctor of Philosophy in Physics in 1927.

In 1932, Powell married Isobel Therese Artner (1907–1995). They had two daughters, Jane and Annie.

== Career and research ==
In 1927, Powell became a research assistant to Arthur Mannering Tyndall in the H. H. Wills Physical Laboratory at the University of Bristol. He was later appointed lecturer and, in 1948, Melville Wills Professor of Physics. In 1936, he took part in a Royal Society expedition to Montserrat in the West Indies as part of a study of a damaging earthquake swarm. He appears on a stamp issued in Grenada.

During his time at Bristol University, Powell applied himself to the development of techniques for measuring the mobility of positive ions, to establishing the nature of the ions in common gases, and to the construction and use of a Cockcroft–Walton generator to study the scattering of atomic nuclei. He also began to develop methods employing specialised photographic emulsions to facilitate the recording of the tracks of elementary particles, and in 1938 began applying this technique to the study of cosmic radiation, exposing photographic plates at high-altitude, at the tops of mountains and using specially designed balloons, collaborating in the study with Giuseppe Occhialini, Hugh Muirhead, and César Lattes. This work led in 1947 to the discovery of the pion (pi-meson), which proved to be the hypothetical particle proposed in 1935 by Hideki Yukawa in his theory of nuclear forces.

In 1950, Powell was awarded the Nobel Prize in Physics "for his development of the photographic method of studying nuclear processes and his discoveries regarding mesons made with this method." Lattes was working with him at the time of the discovery and had improved the sensitivity of the photographic emulsion. Lattes was the first to write an article describing the discovery that would lead to the Nobel Prize. Debendra Mohan Bose and Bibha Chowdhuri published three consecutive papers in Nature, but could not continue further investigation on account of "non-availability of more sensitive emulsion plates" during the war years.

Seven years after this discovery of mesons by Bose and Chowdhuri, Powell made the same discovery of pions and muons and further decay of muons to electrons… using the same technique". He acknowledged in his book, "In 1941, Bose and Chaudhuri [sic] had pointed it out that it is possible, in principle, to distinguish between the tracks of protons and mesons in an emulsion… They concluded that many of the charged particles arrested in their plates were lighter than protons, their mean mass being … the physical basis of their method was correct and their work represents the first approach to the scattering method of determining momenta of charged particles by observation of their tracks in emulsion". In fact, the measured mass of the particle by Bose and Chowdhuri was very close to the accepted value measured by Powell who used improved "full-tone" plates. From 1952, Powell was appointed director of several expeditions to Sardinia and the Po Valley, Italy, utilizing high-altitude balloon flights.

In 1955, Powell, also a member of the World Federation of Scientific Workers, added his signature to the Russell–Einstein Manifesto put forward by Bertrand Russell, Albert Einstein, and Joseph Rotblat, and was involved in preparations for the first Pugwash Conference on Science and World Affairs. As Rotblat put it, "Cecil Powell has been the backbone of the Pugwash Movement. He gave it coherence, endurance and vitality." Powell chaired the meetings of the Pugwash Continuing Committee, often standing in for Bertrand Russell, and attended meetings until 1968.

In 1961, Powell served on the Scientific Policy Committee of the European Organization for Nuclear Research (CERN).

== Global policy ==
He was one of the signatories of the agreement to convene a convention for drafting a world constitution. As a result, for the first time in human history, a World Constituent Assembly convened to draft and adopt the Constitution for the Federation of Earth.

== Death ==
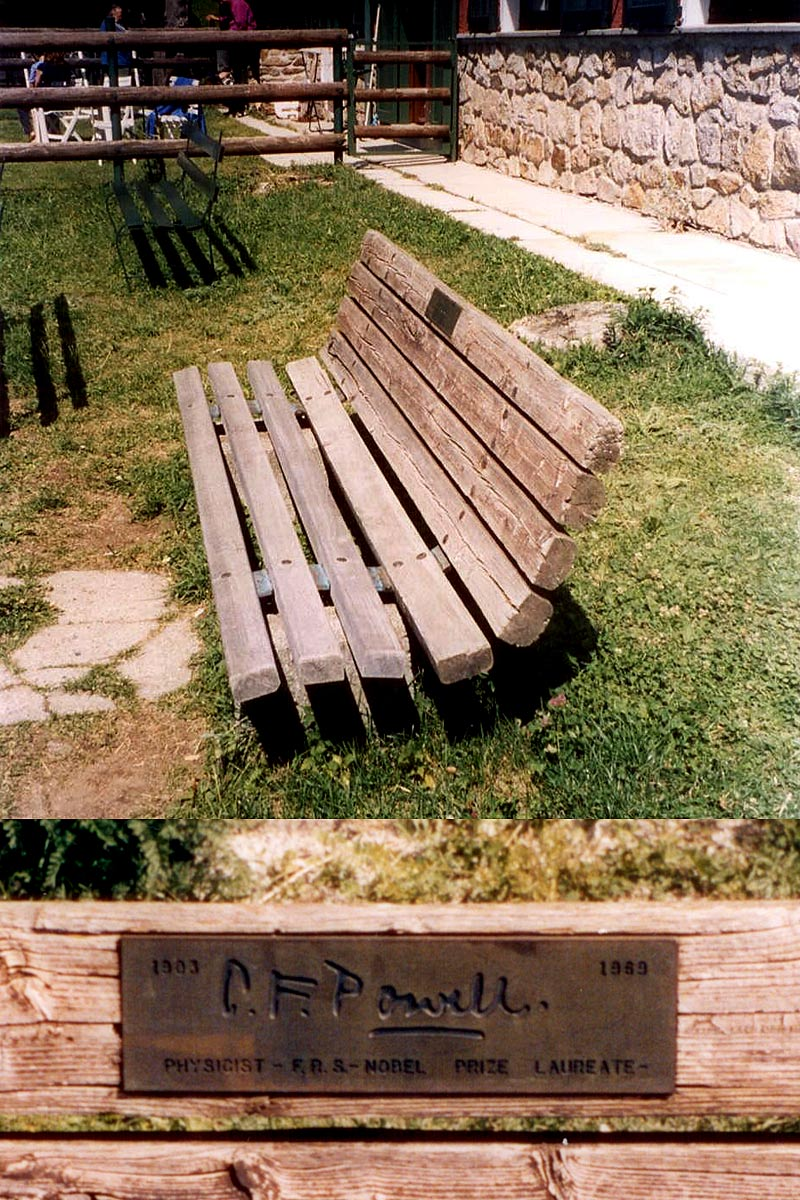
Memorial bench dedicated to Powell outside the Capanna Vittoria restaurant, on the Alpe Giumello in Casargo, Italy.

On 9 August 1969, Powell died of a heart attack while on holiday with his wife in the Valsassina region of Italy, lodging in a house in Sanico, in the Province of Lecco.

Giuseppe Occhialini had a wooden bench built with Powell's name carved into a commemorative plaque, and then transported it to Premana, a village in the mountains above Lake Como. It was installed on the path where he died, outside the Rifugio Capanna Vittoria (now the Capanna Vittoria restaurant), on the Alpe Giumello, in Casargo. Occhialini's reason was, "...if that bench had already been there, Powell would probably have stopped to rest there."

== Recognition ==
=== Memberships ===
Year	Organisation	Type	Ref.
1949	Royal Society	Fellow	

=== Awards ===
Year	Organisation	Award	Citation	Ref.
1949	Royal Society	Hughes Medal	"For his distinguished work on the photography of particle tracks, and in connexion with the discovery of mesons and their transformation."	
1950	Royal Swedish Academy of Sciences	Nobel Prize in Physics	"For his development of the photographic method of studying nuclear processes and his discoveries regarding mesons made with this method."	
1961	Royal Society	Royal Medal	"In recognition of his pioneering work on the development of the photographic emulsion technique in the investigation of cosmic rays and the outstanding results derived therefrom on the elementary particles in cosmic radiation."	
1967	Academy of Sciences of the Soviet Union	Lomonosov Gold Medal	"For outstanding achievements in the field of elementary particle physics."	

== Commemoration ==
- The Cecil F. Powell Memorial Medal was named in his honour by the European Physical Society.
- In October 2011, a replacement commemorative plaque was installed in Downside Road, Bristol.
- In 2013, the International Inner Wheel Club of Lecco, in Lombardy, Northern Italy, erected a sign in memory of Powell, close to where he died, at the Capanna Vittoria restaurant, on the Alpe Giumello, in Casargo.

== See also ==
- Marietta Blau
