= Helena Nussenzveig Lopes =

Brazilian mathematician

Helena Judith Nussenzveig Lopes is a Brazilian mathematician, known for her work on the Euler equations for incompressible flow in fluid dynamics. Since February 2025, CIMPA president. She is a professor titular in the Department of Mathematical Methods at the Federal University of Rio de Janeiro.

== Education and career ==
Nussenzveig Lopes was born in Brazil, the daughter of physicist Herch Moysés Nussenzveig. She earned her Ph.D. from the University of California, Berkeley in 1991. Her dissertation, An Estimate of the Hausdorff Dimension of a Concentration Set for the 2D Incompressible Euler Equations, was jointly supervised by Ronald DiPerna and Lawrence C. Evans.

From 1992 to 2012, she belonged to the faculty of the University of Campinas. She moved to the Federal University of Rio de Janeiro as a full professor in 2012, and headed the department of mathematics there from 2014 to 2016. Shechaired the Society for Industrial and Applied Mathematics Activity Group on Analysis of Partial Differential Equations for 2015–2016.

== Recognition ==
In 2010 she was awarded the National Order of Scientific Merit. In 2016 she became a SIAM Fellow "for advances in analysis of weak solutions of incompressible Euler equations and for advancing applied mathematics in Brazil and internationally".. She was one of the invited speakers in the Partial Differential Equations Section of the 2018 International Congress of Mathematicians. In 2019, she was elected to the Brazilian Academy of Sciences. She was elected to the 2020 Class of Fellows of the American Mathematical Society "for contributions to the analysis of weak solutions of incompressible Euler equations and for advancing applied mathematics in Brazil and internationally." She was also awarded the 2020 World Academy of Sciences award in Mathematics and was elected for membership in the Academy in 2022.
