= Centro Brasileiro de Pesquisas Físicas =

Physics research center in Rio de Janeiro, Brazil

Coordinates: 22°57′14.35″S 43°10′25.35″W

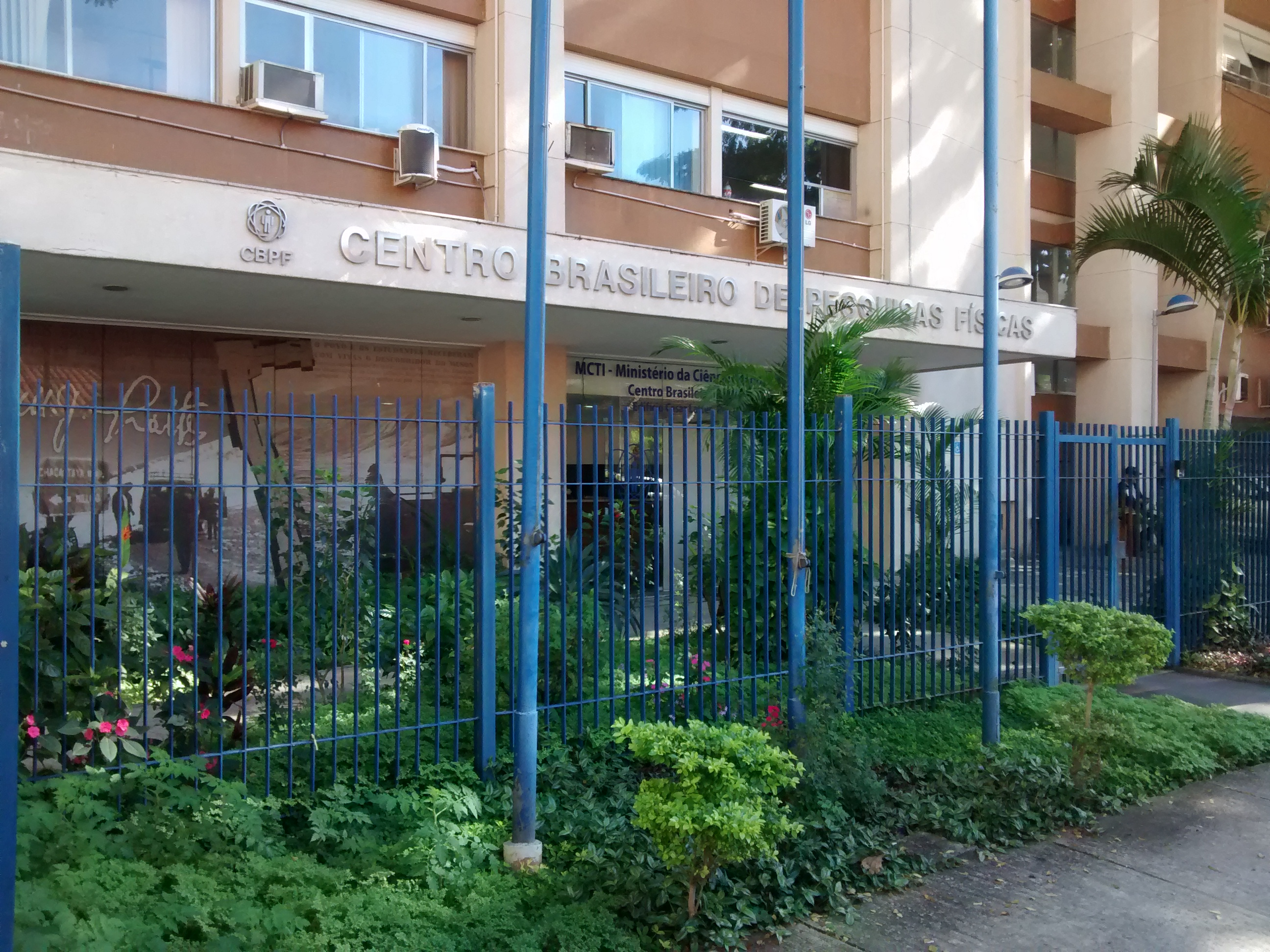
Centro Brasileiro de Pesquisas Físicas

The Brazilian Center for Research in Physics (Portuguese: Centro Brasileiro de Pesquisas Físicas, CBPF) is a physics research center in the Urca neighborhood of Rio de Janeiro sponsored by the Brazilian National Council for Scientific and Technological Development (CNPq), linked to the Ministry of Science and Technology. CBPF was founded in 1949 from a joint effort of Cesar Lattes, José Leite Lopes, and Jayme Tiomno. Throughout its existence, CBPF became an internationally renowned research institution, organizing several international meetings and hosting many renowned physicists, like Richard Feynman and J. Robert Oppenheimer. It was also the starting point of important Brazilian institutions, like the National Institute for Pure and Applied Mathematics (IMPA), the National Laboratory for Scientific Computation (LNCC) and the National Laboratory of Synchrotron Light (LNLS). Since its creation, CBPF has been one of the most important Physics research institutions in Brazil, and its graduate program ranks among the best in the country.

== See also ==
- Maria Laura Moura Mouzinho Leite Lopes
