= Pion =

Subatomic particle; lightest meson

- The quark structure of the positively charged pion.
- Composition: π^{+} : ud̅; π^{0} : $\rm \tfrac{u\overline{u} - d\overline{d}}{\sqrt{2}}$; π^{−} : du̅
- Statistics: Bosonic
- Family: Mesons
- Interactions: Strong, weak, electromagnetic, and gravity
- Symbol: π^{+}, π^{0}, and π^{−}
- Antiparticle: π^{+} : π^{−}; π^{0} : self
- Theorized: Hideki Yukawa (1935)
- Discovered: π^{±} : Bibha Chowdhuri, Debendra Mohan Bose (1942); π^{0} : 1950
- Types: 3
- Mass: π^{±} : 139.57039(18) MeV/c^{2}; π^{0} : 134.9768(5) MeV/c^{2}
- Mean lifetime: π^{±} : 2.6×10^{−8} s; π^{0} : 8.5×10^{−17} s
- Decays into: π^{+} : μ^{+} + ν_{μ}; π^{−} : μ^{−} + ν̅_{μ}; π^{0} : γ + γ
- Electric charge: π^{±} : ±1 e; π^{0} : 0 e
- Charge radius: π^{±} : ±0.659(4) fm
- Color charge: 0
- Spin: 0 ħ
- Isospin: π^{±} : ±1; π^{0} : 0
- Hypercharge: 0
- Parity: −1
- C parity: +1

In particle physics, a pion (/ˈpaɪ.ɒn/, PIE-on) or pi meson, denoted with the Greek letter pi (π), is any of three subatomic particles: π^{0}, π^{+}, and π^{−}. Each pion consists of a quark and an antiquark and is therefore a meson. Pions are the lightest mesons and, more generally, the lightest hadrons. They are unstable, with the charged pions π^{+} and π^{−} decaying after a mean lifetime of 26.033 nanoseconds (2.6033×10^{−8} seconds), and the neutral pion π^{0} decaying after a much shorter lifetime of 85 attoseconds (8.5×10^{−17} seconds). Charged pions most often decay into muons and muon neutrinos, while neutral pions generally decay into gamma rays.

The exchange of virtual pions, along with vector, rho and omega mesons, provides an explanation for the residual strong force between nucleons. Pions are not produced in radioactive decay, but commonly are in high-energy collisions between hadrons. Pions also result from some matter–antimatter annihilation events. All types of pions are also produced in natural processes when high-energy cosmic-ray protons and other hadronic cosmic-ray components interact with matter in Earth's atmosphere. In 2013, the detection of characteristic gamma rays originating from the decay of neutral pions in two supernova remnants has shown that pions are produced copiously after supernovas, most probably in conjunction with production of high-energy protons that are detected on Earth as cosmic rays.

The pion also plays a crucial role in cosmology, by imposing an upper limit on the energies of cosmic rays surviving collisions with the cosmic microwave background, through the Greisen–Zatsepin–Kuzmin limit.

== History ==
An animation of the nuclear force (or residual strong force) interaction. The small colored double disks are gluons. For the choice of anticolors, see Color charge § Red, green, and blue.

Feynman diagram for the same process as in the animation, with the individual quark constituents shown, to illustrate how the fundamental strong interaction gives rise to the nuclear force. Straight lines are quarks, while multi-colored loops are gluons (the carriers of the fundamental force). Other gluons, which bind together the proton, neutron, and pion "in-flight", are not shown. The π^{0} meson contains an anti-quark, shown as travelling in the opposite direction, as per the Feynman–Stueckelberg interpretation.

Theoretical work by Hideki Yukawa in 1935 had predicted the existence of mesons as the carrier particles of the strong nuclear force. From the range of the strong nuclear force (inferred from the radius of the atomic nucleus), Yukawa predicted the existence of a particle having a mass of about 100 MeV/c^{2}. Initially after its discovery in 1936, the muon (initially called the "mesotron" or the "mu meson") was thought to be this particle, since it has a mass of 106 MeV/c^{2}. However, later experiments showed that the muon did not participate in the strong nuclear interaction. In modern terminology, this makes the muon a lepton, and not a meson. The pions, which were later identified as the mesons predicted by Yukawa, were confirmed afterward: charged pions in 1947 and neutral pions in 1950.

In 1941–42, Bibha Chowdhuri and Debendra Mohan Bose reported cosmic-ray meson tracks at the Bose Institute that later historians have regarded as early evidence of pions. Although particle accelerators had already been developed by the early 1930s, atmospheric cosmic rays remained the principal source of high-energy subatomic particles until high-energy accelerators became available in the early 1950s. Photographic emulsions were placed for long periods of time in sites located atop Mount Sandakphu in present-day West Bengal and in the higher town of Pharijong in Tibet. The particles recorded at Sandakphu (about 221 m_{e} [113 MeV/c^{2}]) were lighter than those observed at Pharijong (about 278 m_{e} [142 MeV/c^{2}]), which led to a tentative conclusion that the lighter ones (the muons) were the decay product of the heavier ones (the pions). However, follow-up studies could not be conducted because only halftone plates were available during World War II. In 1947, a team at the University of Bristol led by C. F. Powell, including César Lattes, Giuseppe Occhialini and Hugh Muirhead, reported the discovery of the charged pion. The first evidence came from particle tracks recorded in improved nuclear photographic emulsions exposed by Occhialini at Pic du Midi de Bigorre, they were conducted at an altitude of 2,8 meters. Lattes subsequently exposed borax-loaded plates at Chacaltaya in Bolivia, at an altitude of 5,421 meters where the greater altitude provided more favorable conditions for detecting pions produced by cosmic rays. These plates recorded many more pion-to-muon decay events, strengthening the evidence and enabling more precise measurements. Powell alone received the 1950 Nobel Prize in Physics, awarded for his development of the photographic method and his discoveries concerning mesons.

Marietta Kurz was the first person to detect the unusual "double meson" tracks upon inspecting the Powell team's plates, characteristic for a pion decaying into a muon, but they were too close to the edge of the photographic emulsion and deemed incomplete. A few days later, Irene Roberts observed the tracks left by pion decay that appeared in the discovery paper. Both women are credited in the figure captions in the article, and the previous study by Chowdhuri and Bose was credited as well.

In 1948, Lattes, Eugene Gardner, and their team first artificially produced pions at the University of California's cyclotron in Berkeley, California, by bombarding carbon atoms with high-speed alpha particles. Further advanced theoretical work was carried out by Riazuddin, who in 1959 used the dispersion relation for Compton scattering of virtual photons on pions to analyze their charge radius.

Since the neutral pion is not electrically charged, it is more difficult to detect and observe than the charged pions are. Neutral pions do not leave tracks in photographic emulsions or Wilson cloud chambers. The existence of the neutral pion was inferred from observing its decay products from cosmic rays, a so-called "soft component" of slow electrons with photons. The π^{0} was identified definitively at the University of California's cyclotron in 1949 by observing its decay into two photons. Later in the same year, they were also observed in cosmic-ray balloon experiments at Bristol University.

... Yukawa choose the letter π because of its resemblance to the Kanji character for 介 [kai], which means "to mediate", based on the idea that the meson works as a strong force mediator particle between hadrons.

== Possible applications ==
The use of pions in medical radiation therapy, such as for cancer, was explored at a number of research institutions, including the Los Alamos National Laboratory's Meson Physics Facility, which treated 228 patients between 1974 and 1981 in New Mexico, and the TRIUMF laboratory in Vancouver, British Columbia.

== Theoretical overview ==
In the standard understanding of the strong force interaction as defined by quantum chromodynamics, pions are loosely portrayed as Goldstone bosons of spontaneously broken chiral symmetry. That explains why the masses of the three kinds of pions are considerably less than that of the other mesons, such as the scalar or vector mesons. If their current quarks were massless particles, it could make the chiral symmetry exact and thus the Goldstone theorem would dictate that all pions have a zero mass.

In fact, it was shown by Gell-Mann, Oakes and Renner (GMOR) that the square of the pion mass is proportional to the sum of the quark masses times the quark condensate:
$$M^2_\pi = (m_\text{u}+m_\text{d})B+\mathcal{O}(m^2),$$
with B the quark condensate:
$$B = \left\vert \frac{\rm \langle 0 \vert \bar{u}u \vert 0 \rangle}{f^2_\pi} \right\vert_{m_\text{q} \to 0}$$
This is often known as the GMOR relation and it explicitly shows that $M_\pi=0$ in the massless quark limit. The same result also follows from light-front holography.

Empirically, since the light quarks actually have minuscule nonzero masses, the pions also have nonzero rest masses. However, those masses are almost an order of magnitude smaller than that of the nucleons, roughly $\ m_\pi \approx \tfrac{ \sqrt{ v\ m_\text{q}\ } }{\ f_\pi } \approx \sqrt{ m_\text{q}\ }\$ 45 MeV, where m_{q} are the relevant current quark masses, around 5–10 MeV/c^{2}.

The pion is one of the particles that mediate the residual strong interaction between a pair of nucleons. This interaction is attractive: it pulls the nucleons together. Written in a non-relativistic form, it is called the Yukawa potential. The pion, being spinless, has kinematics described by the Klein–Gordon equation. In the terms of quantum field theory, the effective field theory Lagrangian describing the pion-nucleon interaction is called the Yukawa interaction.

The nearly identical masses of π^{±} and π^{0} indicate that there must be a symmetry at play: this symmetry is called the SU(2) flavour symmetry or isospin. The reason that there are three pions, π^{+}, π^{−} and π^{0}, is that these are understood to belong to the triplet representation or the adjoint representation 3 of SU(2). By contrast, the up and down quarks transform according to the fundamental representation 2 of SU(2), whereas the anti-quarks transform according to the conjugate representation 2*.

With the addition of the strange quark, the pions participate in a larger, SU(3), flavour symmetry, in the adjoint representation, 8, of SU(3). The other members of this octet are the four kaons and the eta meson.

Pions are pseudoscalars under a parity transformation. Pion currents thus couple to the axial vector current and so participate in the chiral anomaly.

== Basic properties ==
Pions, which are mesons with zero spin, are composed of first-generation quarks. In the quark model, an up quark and an anti-down quark make up a π^{+}, whereas a down quark and an anti-up quark make up the π^{−}, and these are the antiparticles of one another. The neutral pion π^{0} is a combination of an up quark with an anti-up quark, or a down quark with an anti-down quark. The two combinations have identical quantum numbers, and hence they are only found in superpositions. The lowest-energy superposition of these is the π^{0}, which is its own antiparticle. Together, the pions form a triplet of isospin. Each pion has overall isospin (I = 1) and third-component isospin equal to its charge (I_{z} = +1, 0, −1).

=== Charged pion decays ===
Feynman diagram of the dominant leptonic pion decay.

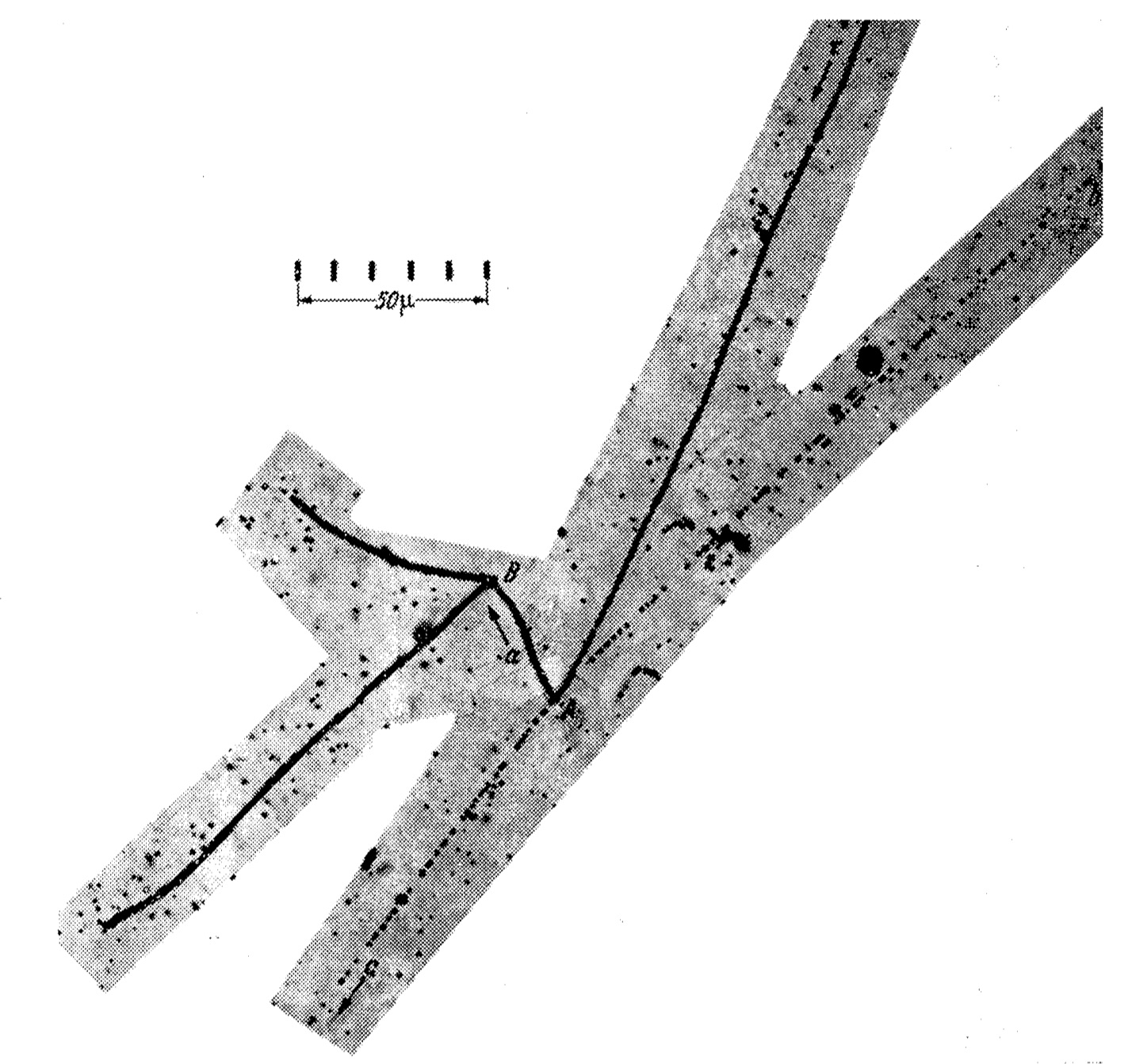
Kaon decay in a nuclear emulsion. The positively-charged kaon enters at the top of the image and decays into a π^{−} meson (a) and two π^{+} mesons (b and c). The π^{−} meson interacts with a nucleus in the emulsion at B.

The π^{±} mesons have a mass of 139.6 MeV/c^{2} and a mean lifetime of 2.6033×10^{−8} s. They decay due to the weak interaction. The primary decay mode of a pion, with a branching fraction of 0.999877, is a leptonic decay into a muon and a muon neutrino:
$$\begin{align}
\pi^+ &\longrightarrow \mu^+ + \nu_\mu \\[2pt]
\pi^- &\longrightarrow \mu^- + \overline\nu_\mu
\end{align}$$

The second most common decay mode of a pion, with a branching fraction of 0.000123, is also a leptonic decay into an electron and the corresponding electron antineutrino. This "electronic mode" was discovered at CERN in 1958:
$$\begin{align}
\pi^+ &\longrightarrow {\rm e}^+ + \nu_e \\[2pt]
\pi^- &\longrightarrow {\rm e}^- + \overline\nu_e
\end{align}$$

The suppression of the electronic decay mode with respect to the muonic one is given approximately (up to a few percent effect of the radiative corrections) by the ratio of the half-widths of the pion–electron and the pion–muon decay reactions,
$$R_\pi = \left(\frac{m_e}{m_\mu}\right)^2 \left(\frac{m_\pi^2 - m_e^2}{m_\pi^2 - m_\mu^2}\right)^2 = 1.283 \times 10^{-4}$$
and is a spin effect known as helicity suppression.

Its mechanism is as follows: The negative pion has spin zero; therefore the lepton and the antineutrino must be emitted with opposite spins (and opposite linear momenta) to preserve net zero spin (and conserve linear momentum). However, because the weak interaction is sensitive only to the left chirality component of fields, the antineutrino has always left chirality, which means it is right-handed, since for massless anti-particles the helicity is opposite to the chirality. This implies that the lepton must be emitted with spin in the direction of its linear momentum (i.e., also right-handed). If, however, leptons were massless, they would only interact with the pion in the left-handed form (because for massless particles helicity is the same as chirality) and this decay mode would be prohibited. Therefore, suppression of the electron decay channel comes from the fact that the electron's mass is much smaller than the muon's. The electron is relatively massless compared with the muon, and thus the electronic mode is greatly suppressed relative to the muonic one, virtually prohibited.

Although this explanation suggests that parity violation is causing the helicity suppression, the fundamental reason lies in the vector-nature of the interaction which dictates a different handedness for the neutrino and the charged lepton. Thus, even a parity conserving interaction would yield the same suppression.

Measurements of the above ratio have been considered for decades to be a test of lepton universality. Experimentally, this ratio is 1.233(2)×10^{−4}.

Beyond the purely leptonic decays of pions, some structure-dependent radiative leptonic decays (that is, decay to the usual leptons plus a gamma ray) have also been observed.

Also observed, for charged pions only, is the very rare "pion beta decay" (with branching fraction of about 10^{−8}) into a neutral pion, an electron and an electron antineutrino (or for positive pions, a neutral pion, a positron, and electron neutrino).
$$\begin{align}
\pi^+ &\longrightarrow \pi^0 + {\rm e}^+ + \nu_e \\[2pt]
\pi^- &\longrightarrow \pi^0 + {\rm e}^- + \overline\nu_e
\end{align}$$

The rate at which pions decay is a prominent quantity in many sub-fields of particle physics, such as chiral perturbation theory. This rate is parametrized by the pion decay constant (f_{π}), related to the wave function overlap of the quark and antiquark, which is about 130 MeV.

=== Neutral pion decays ===
The π^{0} meson has a mass of 135.0 MeV/c^{2} and a mean lifetime of 8.5×10^{−17} s. It decays via the electromagnetic force, which explains why its mean lifetime is much smaller than that of the charged pion (which can only decay via the weak force).

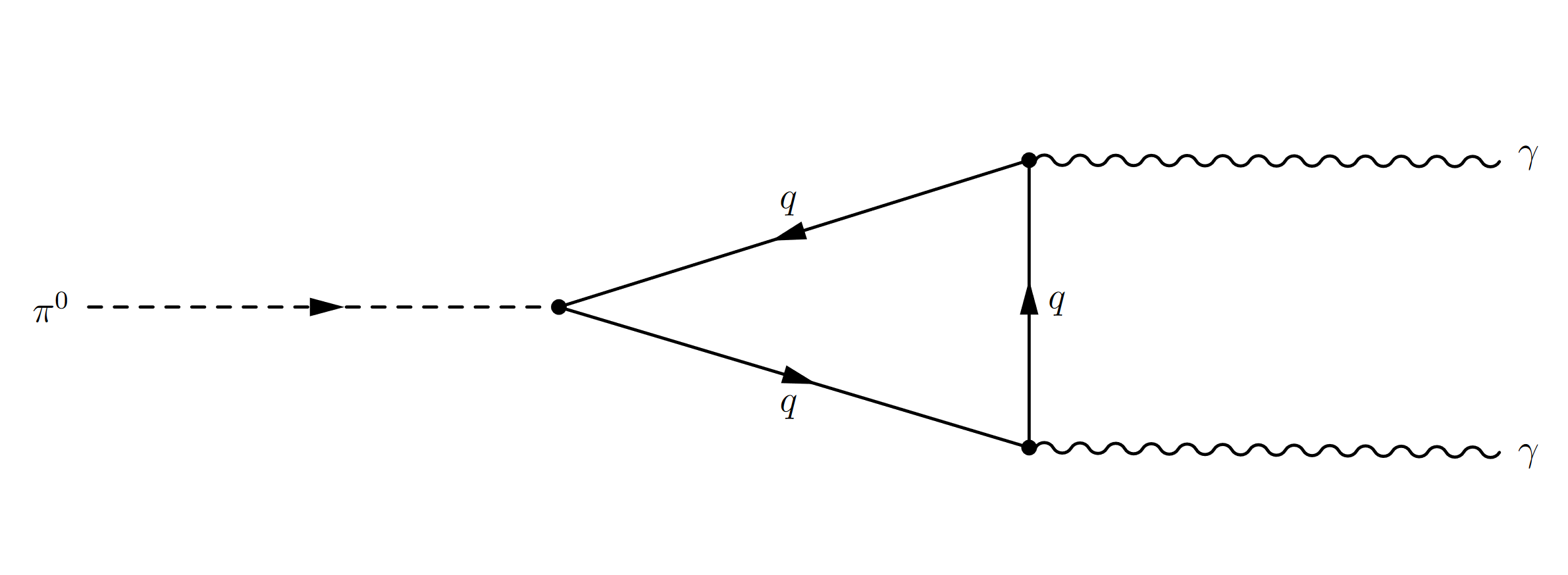
Anomaly-induced neutral pion decay.

The dominant π^{0} decay mode, with a branching ratio of BR_{γγ} = 0.98823, is into two photons:
$$\pi^0 \longrightarrow 2\ \gamma$$

The decay π^{0} → 3 γ (as well as decays into any odd number of photons) is forbidden by the C-symmetry of the electromagnetic interaction: The intrinsic C-parity of the π^{0} is +1, while the C-parity of a system of n photons is (−1)^{n}.

The second largest π^{0} decay mode (BR_{γee̅} = 0.01174) is the Dalitz decay (named after Richard Dalitz), which is a two-photon decay with an internal photon conversion resulting in a photon and an electron-positron pair in the final state:
$$\pi^0 \longrightarrow \gamma + \rm e^- + e^+$$

The third largest established decay mode (BR_{2e2e̅} = 3.34×10^{−5}) is the double-Dalitz decay, with both photons undergoing internal conversion which leads to further suppression of the rate:
$$\pi^0 \longrightarrow \rm 2 \ e^- + 2\ e^+$$

The fourth largest established decay mode is the loop-induced and therefore suppressed (and additionally helicity-suppressed) leptonic decay mode (BR_{ee̅} = 6.46×10^{−8}):
$$\pi^0 \longrightarrow \rm e^- + e^+$$

The neutral pion has also been observed to decay into positronium with a branching fraction on the order of 10^{−9}. No other decay modes have been established experimentally. The branching fractions above are the PDG central values, and their uncertainties are omitted, but available in the cited publication.

Pions
Particle name	Particle symbol	Antiparticle symbol	Quark content	Rest mass [MeV/c^{2}]	I^{G}	J^{PC}	S	C	B′	Mean lifetime [s]	Commonly decays to (> 5% of decays)
Pion	π^{+}	π^{−}	ud̅	139.57039 ± 0.00018	1^{−}	0^{−}	0	0	0	(2.6033±0.0005)×10^{−8}	μ^{+} + ν_{μ}
Pion	π^{0}	Self	$\tfrac{\mathrm{u\bar{u}} - \mathrm{d\bar{d}}}{\sqrt 2}$^{^{[a]}}	134.9768±0.0005	1^{−}	0^{−+}	0	0	0	(8.5±0.2)×10^{−17}	γ + γ

^{[a]} The quark composition of the π^{0} is not exactly divided between up and down quarks, due to complications from non-zero quark masses.

== See also ==
- Standard Model of particle physics
- Mathematical formulation of the Standard Model
- Pionium
- Quark model
- Static forces and virtual-particle exchange
- Sanford–Wang parameterisation
