= Giuseppe Occhialini =

Italian experimental physicist (1907–1993

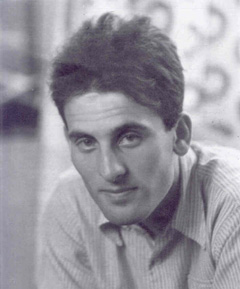
- Born: Giuseppe Paolo Stanislao Occhialini; 5 December 1907; Fossombrone, Marche, Kingdom of Italy
- Died: 30 December 1993 (aged 86)
- Education: University of Florence
- Known for: Discovery of the pion; Discovery of the positron
- Awards: Premio Presidente della Repubblica (1949); Wolf Prize in Physics (1979)
- Scientific career
- Fields: Particle physics
- Workplaces: University of Cambridge; University of São Paulo; University of Bristol; University of Genoa; University of Milan

Giuseppe Paolo Stanislao "Beppo" Occhialini (Italian: [dʒuˈzɛppe okkjaˈliːni]; 5 December 1907 – 30 December 1993) was an Italian experimental physicist who contributed to the discovery of the pion or pi-meson decay in 1947 with César Lattes and Cecil Powell, the latter winning the Nobel Prize in Physics for this work. At the time of this discovery, they were all working in the H. H. Wills Laboratory at the University of Bristol.

== Biography ==
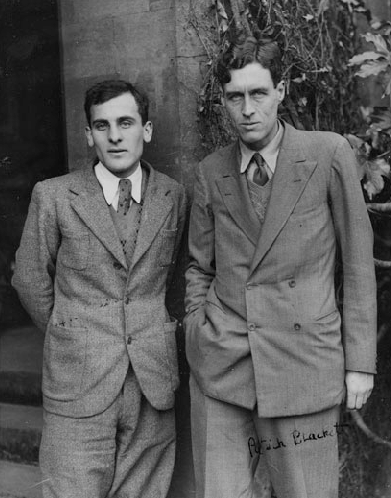
Giuseppe (Beppo) P.S. Occhialini and Patrick Blackett in 1932 or 1933. Credit: Giuseppe Occhialini and Constance Dilworth Archive, Università degli Studi di Milano Statale.

Giuseppe Paolo Stanislao Occhialini was born on 5 December 1907 in Fossombrone, Italy, and graduated from the University of Florence in 1929. In 1932, he collaborated in the discovery of the positron in cosmic rays in the Cavendish Laboratory at the University of Cambridge, under the leadership of Patrick Blackett, using cloud chambers.

Occhialini returned in Italy in 1934, where he suffered from the political climate generated by fascism. Thus, from 1937 to 1944, following an invitation by Gleb Wataghin, he worked at the Institute of Physics of the University of São Paulo in Brazil.

In 1944, Occhialini returned to England, working in the Wills Physics Laboratory at the University of Bristol, where he studied cosmic rays. In 1947, while in Bristol, he contributed to the discovery of the pion or pi-meson decay in collaboration with César Lattes, Cecil Powell, and Hugh Muirhead. The discovery was made using the technology of the tracks on specialized photographic emulsions. Powell won the Nobel Prize in Physics in 1950, in large part for this work.

In 1950, Occhialini returned to Italy, teaching first at the University of Genoa and then in the Physics Department at the University of Milan in 1952.

Occhialini was a protagonist in cosmic ray research with the nuclear utilization of photographic emulsions exposed to high energy cosmic radiation, work which culminated in 1954 with the European G-Stack collaboration, that focused on the decay products of the kaons. Later on with the coming of particle accelerators, Occhialini explored that new field of research. He also made outstanding contributions to space physics, importantly contributing to the foundation of the European Space Agency.

== Personal life ==
Occhialini was an avid mountain climber. During World War II, while staying in Brazil—then a country hostile to Italy—he became an authorized alpine guide in Itatiaia National Park, where there is a peak named Pico Occhialini.

== Recognition ==
=== Awards ===
Year	Organization	Award	Citation	Ref.
1949	(Italy) Accademia dei Lincei	Premio Presidente della Repubblica		
1979	(Israel) Wolf Foundation	Wolf Prize in Physics (Note: Awarded jointly with George Uhlenbeck.)	"For his contributions to the discovery of electron pair production and of the charged pion."	

=== Memberships ===
Year	Organization	Type	Ref.
1974	(United Kingdom) Royal Society	Foreign Member	
1975	(United States) American Philosophical Society	International Member	
1978	(United States) National Academy of Sciences	International Member	

== Commemoration ==
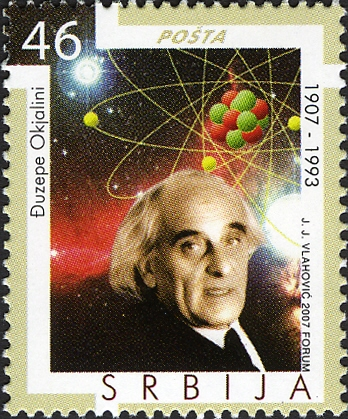
Occhialini on a 2007 Serbian stamp.

- The Department of Physics of the University of Milan-Bicocca, active since 1997, is named after him.
- The satellite SAX, the first Italian satellite for the study of gamma rays, was renamed BeppoSAX from his nickname "Beppo," which is a diminutive for Giuseppe.
- An asteroid, 20081 Occhialini, was named for him.
- In 2004, Prof. Antonio Vitale, Ordinary Professor of Physics at the University of Bologna, created the "Foundation Giuseppe Occhialini" with its seat at Fossombrone, birth town of Giuseppe Occhialini. The Foundation has as its objective the popularization of physics in the superior schools, and is active above all in the province of Pesaro-Urbino, where every year there is held a course with the allocation of scholarships for the worthiest students.
- In 2007, the Italian Physical Society, together with the Institute of Physics, instituted the Occhialini Prize to honor his memory.
- On 22 June 2009, a square in Milan square was named after him, that same square where the Institute of Physics was at the time he first became professor there. The sign in the square was unveiled at a ceremony with the deans of both of Milan's state universities, Enrico Decleva and Marcello Fontanesi, Beppo's daughter Etra, and Professor Guido Vegni, one of Beppo's pupils and successors in particle physics research.
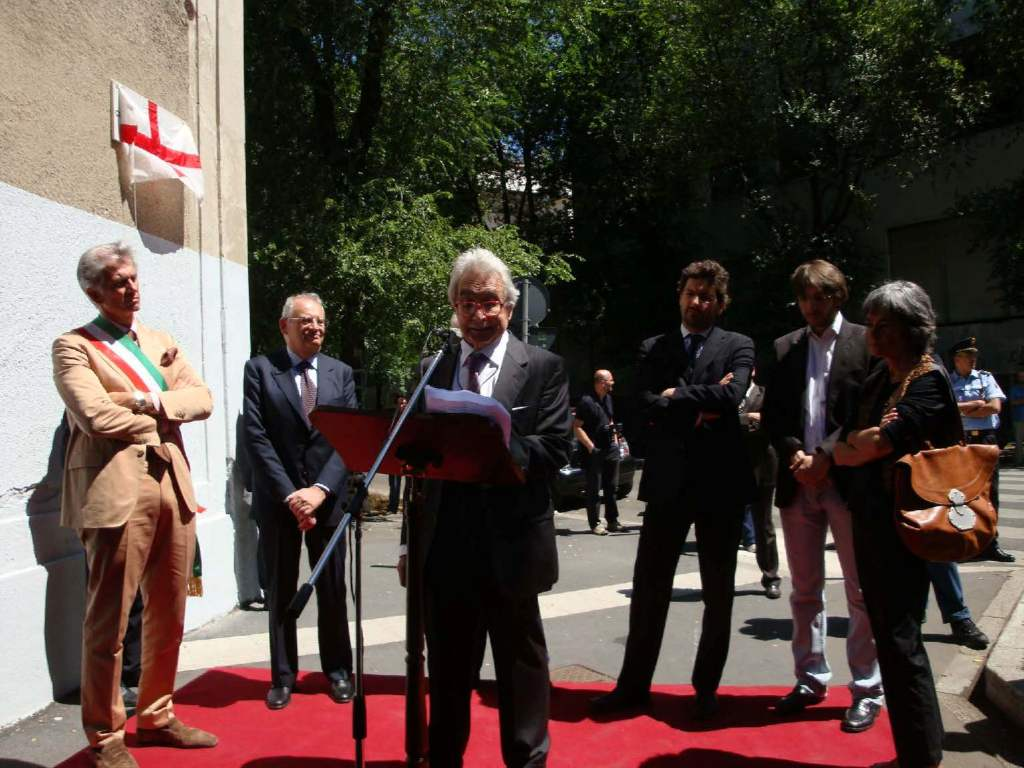
Unveiling of the Piazza Occhialini (Occhialini Square) sign, 22 June 2009, Milan, Italy

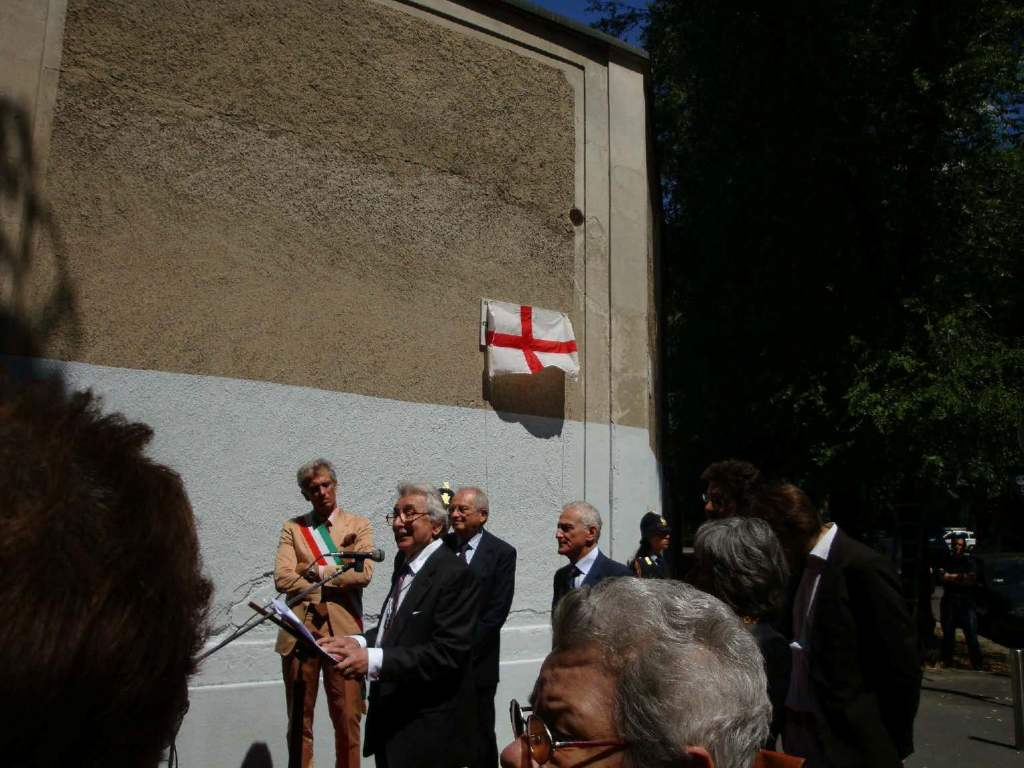
The Piazza Occhialini (Occhialini Square) sign, Milan, Italy
