= National Council for Scientific and Technological Development =

Brazilian government agency for scientific research organization

- Conselho Nacional de Desenvolvimento Científico e Tecnológico
- Abbreviation: CNPq
- Formation: January 15, 1951
- Purpose: Science and technology research
- Headquarters: Brasília, Brazil
- President: Ricardo Galvão (2023)
- Parent organization: Ministry of Science and Technology
- Website: www.cnpq.br

The National Council for Scientific and Technological Development (Portuguese: Conselho Nacional de Desenvolvimento Científico e Tecnológico, earlier Conselho Nacional de Pesquisas, CNPq) is a government agency under the Ministry of Science and Technology of the Brazilian federal government. The council is dedicated to the promotion of scientific and technological research and to the formation of human resources for research in the country.

== Background ==
The main attributes that the National Council for Scientific and Technological Development (CNPq) see towards is the national development of Brazilian researchers and institutes, while developing recognition it wants on a global scale. The CNPq was started in 1951, and has a leading role in conducting and formulating research about technology, science and also innovation on current topics such as artificial intelligence and others. The goal of the CNPq is to promote science, technology and innovation and act in the formulation of their policies which thereby will lead to taking the frontier in knowledge, national sovereignty and sustainable development. By doing this, they are on the road to being recognized for their excellence and development not only in these elements but for the country as a whole.

== See also ==
- CAPES (Brazil)
- Lattes Platform
- Brazilian science and technology
- Universities and higher education in Brazil
- Ministry of Science and Technology (Brazil)
- Maria Laura Moura Mouzinho Leite Lopes
- Cesar Lattes
