= César Lattes =

Brazilian physicist (1924–2005)

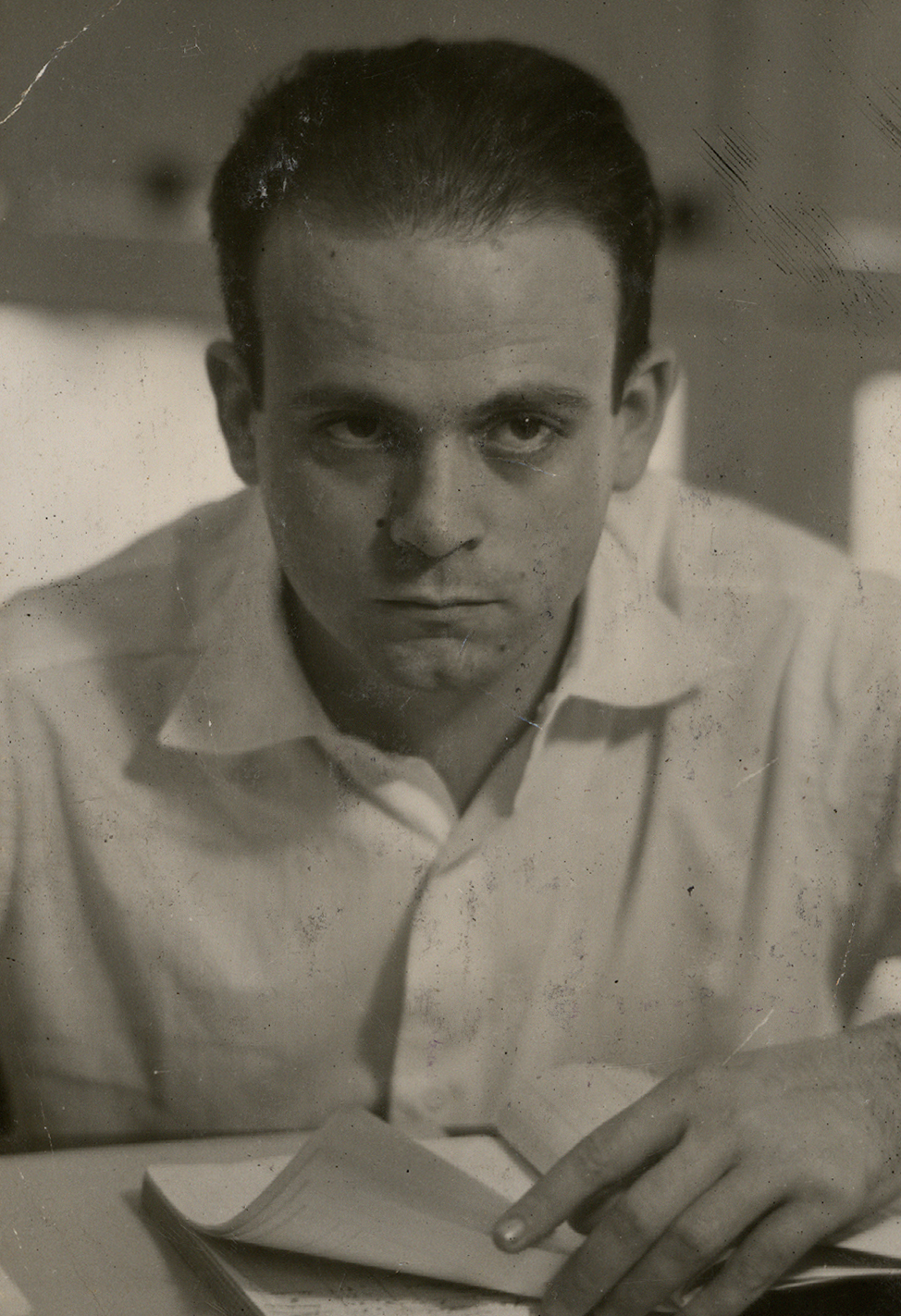
- Born: Cesare Mansueto Giulio Lattes; 11 July 1924; Curitiba, Paraná, Brazil
- Died: 8 March 2005 (aged 80); Campinas, São Paulo, Brazil
- Education: University of São Paulo
- Known for: Discovery of the pion
- Spouse: Martha Lattes
- Children: 4
- Scientific career
- Fields: Physics
- Workplaces: University of São Paulo; Federal University of Rio de Janeiro; University of Campinas; Brazilian Center for Physical Research; Bristol University

Cesare Mansueto Giulio Lattes (11 July 1924 – 8 March 2005), also known as César Lattes, was a Brazilian experimental physicist, one of the discoverers of the pion, a subatomic particle composed of a quark and an antiquark.

== Life ==
Lattes was born to a family of Italian immigrants in Curitiba, Paraná, Brazil. He began his basic studies at his home state but later on moved to São Paulo, where he finished high school. He proceeded to enroll in the University of São Paulo, graduating in 1943, in mathematics and physics. He was part of an initial group of young Brazilian physicists who worked under European teachers such as Gleb Wataghin and Giuseppe Occhialini. Lattes was considered the most brilliant student in his group and was noted at a very young age as a bold researcher. His colleagues, who also became important Brazilian scientists, were Oscar Sala, Mário Schenberg, Roberto Salmeron, Marcelo Damy de Souza Santos and Jayme Tiomno. At the age of 25, he was one of the founders of the Brazilian Center for Physical Research (Centro Brasileiro de Pesquisas Físicas) in Rio de Janeiro.

From 1946 to 1948, Lattes launched on his main research line by studying cosmic rays. He travelled to England arriving in February 1946, to join his teacher Occhialini who had arrived the previous year, to work in the group directed by Cecil Powell at the H. H. Wills Physics Laboratory of the University of Bristol. There, he improved on the nuclear emulsion used by Powell by adding more boron to it. In 1947, he collaborated with Powell, Occhialini and Hugh Muirhead in the experimental discovery of the pion (or pi meson). In the same year he, along Powell and Occhialini, determined the mass of the new particle. In April 1947 he visited a weather station on top of the 5,200-meter-high Chacaltaya mountain in Bolivia, using photographic plates to register rays and reveal more 'pion decay events'. A year later, working with Eugene H. Gardner (1913-1950) at UC Berkeley, Lattes was able to detect the artificial production of pions in the lab's cyclotron by bombarding carbon atoms with alpha particles. He was just 24 years old.

In 1949, Lattes returned as a professor and researcher with the Federal University of Rio de Janeiro and the Brazilian Center for Physical Research. After another brief stay in the United States from 1955 to 1957, he returned to Brazil and accepted a position at his alma mater, the Department of Physics of the University of São Paulo.

In 1967, Lattes accepted a position of full professor with the new Institute of Physics "Gleb Wataghin" at the State University of Campinas (Unicamp), which he helped to found. He became the chairman of the Department of Cosmic Rays, Chronology, High Energies and Leptons. In 1969, he and his group discovered the mass of the so-called fireballs, a phenomenon induced by naturally occurring high-energy collisions, which was detected by means of special lead-chamber nuclear emulsion plates invented by him and placed at the Chacaltaya peak of the Bolivian Andes.

Lattes retired in 1986, when he received from Unicamp the title of doctor honoris causa and professor emeritus. After retirement he continued to live in a house in the suburban area close to the university's campus. He died of a heart attack on March 8, 2005, in Campinas, São Paulo.

== Legacy ==
Lattes is one of the most widely recognized and honored Brazilian physicists, and his work was fundamental for the development of atomic physics. He was considered one of the greatest scientific leaders of Brazilian Physics and was one of the main personalities behind the creation of the important Brazilian National Research Council (Conselho Nacional de Desenvolvimento Científico e Tecnológico). Due to his contribution in this process, the Brazilian national science database was named Lattes Platform after him.

He is one of the few Brazilian scientists with an article in the Encyclopædia Britannica. Although he was the main researcher and the first author of the historical Nature article describing the pion, only Cecil Powell was awarded the Nobel Prize for Physics in 1950 for "his development of the photographic method of studying nuclear processes and his discoveries regarding mesons made with this method". The reason for this apparent neglect is that the Nobel Committee policy until 1960 was to give the award to the research group head only. He received the TWAS Prize in 1987. After his death Unicamp decided to give his name to its central library.

On 11 July 2024, Google celebrated his 100th birthday with a Google doodle.

== Quote ==
"Science should be universal, without a doubt. However, one should not believe unconditionally in this."

== Culture ==
Gilberto Gil's Grammy-winning 1998 album Quanta includes a song dedicated to Lattes, called "Ciência e Arte".

== Bibliography ==
- C.M.G. Lattes; H. Muirhead; G.P.S. Occhialini; C.F. Powell (1947). "Processes involving charged mesons". Nature. 159 (4047): 694–697. Bibcode:1947Natur.159..694L. doi:10.1038/159694a0. S2CID 4152828.
- C.M.G. Lattes; G.P.S. Occhialini; C.F. Powell (1948). "A determination of the ratio of the masses of pi-meson and mu-meson by the method of grain-counting". Proceedings of the Physical Society. 61 (2): 173–183. Bibcode:1948PPS....61..173L. doi:10.1088/0959-5309/61/2/308.
- E. Gardner; C.M.G. Lattes (1948). "Production of mesons by the 184-inch Berkeley cyclotron". Science. 107 (2776): 270–271. Bibcode:1948Sci...107..270G. doi:10.1126/science.107.2776.270. OSTI 971840. PMID 17844504.
- C.M.G. Lattes; C.Q. Orsini; I.G. Pacca; M.T. Cruz; E. Okuno; Y. Fujimoto; K. Yokoi (1963). "Observation of extremely high energy nuclear events with emulsion chamber exposed on Mt. Chacaltaya". Il Nuovo Cimento. 28 (3): 2160. Bibcode:1963NCim...28..614L. doi:10.1007/bf02828877. S2CID 121405654.
