= Mário Schenberg =

Brazilian electrical engineer, physicist, art critic and writer (1914–1990)

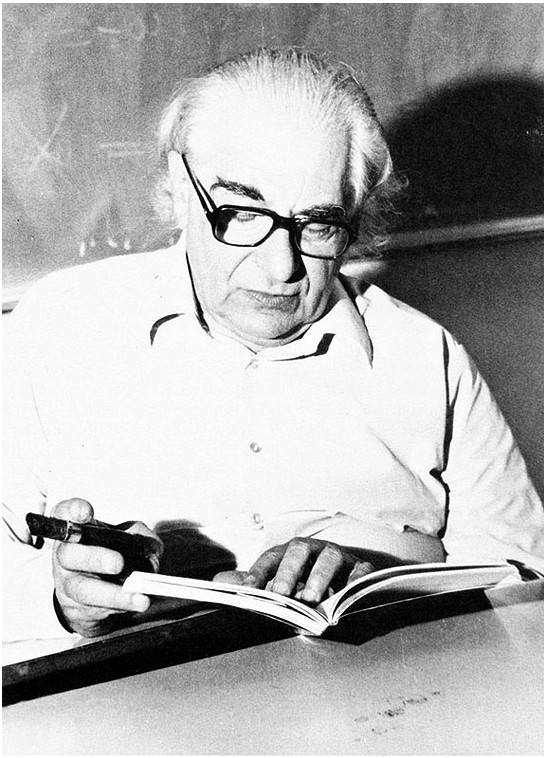
- Born: Mayer Schönberg; July 2, 1914; Recife, Pernambuco, Brazil
- Died: November 10, 1990 (aged 76); São Paulo, Brazil
- Education: University of São Paulo
- Known for: Schönberg-Chandrasekhar limit Urca process
- Scientific career
- Fields: Theoretical physics
- Doctoral students: José Leite Lopes

Notes
- Brazilian physicist of the 'heroic era' (1900–1945), together with José Leite Lopes, Cesar Lattes, Jayme Tiomno, and Joaquim da Costa Ribeiro.

Mário Schenberg (born Mayer Schönberg [var. Mário Schönberg, Mario Schonberg, Mário Schoenberg]; 2 July 1914 – 10 November 1990) was a Brazilian electrical engineer, physicist, art critic and writer.

== Early life ==
Schenberg was born on 2 July 1914 in Recife, Brazil as Mayer Schönberg. His parents were Russian Jews of German origin. From early on he showed remarkable ability for mathematics, enchanting himself with geometry, which had a strong influence on his works. He took the primary and secondary courses in Recife. Because of his family's financial limitations, he was not able to study in Europe. He then entered the Faculty of Engineering of Recife in 1931.

== Scientific work ==
=== The Urca process ===
Widely regarded as one of Brazil's most important theoretical physicists, Schenberg is best remembered for his contributions to astrophysics, particularly the theory of nuclear processes in the formation of supernova stars. He provided the inspiration for the name of the so-called Urca process, a cycle of nuclear reactions in which a nucleus loses energy by absorbing an electron and then re-emitting a beta particle plus a neutrino-antineutrino pair, leading to the loss of internal supporting pressure and consequent collapse and explosion in the form of a supernova. George Gamow (1904–1968) was inspired to name the process Urca after the name of the Urca Casino in Rio de Janeiro, when Schönberg remarked to him that "the energy disappears in the nucleus of the supernova as quickly as the money disappeared at that roulette table."

=== Schönberg–Chandrasekhar limit ===
Together with Indian physicist Subrahmanyan Chandrasekhar (1910–1995), he discovered and published in 1942 the so-called Schönberg–Chandrasekhar limit, which is the maximum mass of the core of a star that can support the overlying layers against gravitational collapse once the core hydrogen is exhausted.

=== Quantum physics and geometric algebra ===
At the University of São Paulo Schönberg interacted closely with David Bohm during the final years of Bohm's exile in Brazil, and, in 1954, Schönberg demonstrated a link among the quantized motion of the Madelung fluid and the trajectories of the de Broglie–Bohm theory.

He wrote a series of publications of 1957/1958 on geometric algebras applicable to quantum physics and quantum field theory. He pointed out that those algebras can be described in terms of extensions of the commutative and the anti-commutative Grassmann algebras which have the same structure as the boson algebra and the fermion algebra of creation and annihilation operators. These algebras, in turn, are related to symplectic algebras and to Clifford algebras, respectively.

In a paper published in 1958, Schönberg suggested to add a new idempotent to the Heisenberg algebra, and this suggestion was taken up and expanded upon in the 1980s by Basil Hiley and his co-workers in their work on algebraic formulations of quantum mechanics; this work was performed at Birkbeck College where Bohm had become professor of physics in the meantime. Schönberg's ideas have also been cited in connection with algebraic approaches to describe relativistic phase space.

His work has been cited, together with that of Marcel Riesz, for its importance to Clifford algebras and mathematical physics in the proceedings of a workshop held in France in 1989 which had been dedicated to these two mathematicians.

== Politics and life ==
Schenberg was a member of the Brazilian Communist Party and professor of the University of São Paulo.

He died on 10 November 1990 in São Paulo.

== Articles ==
His articles include:

- M. Schönberg: Quantum kinematics and geometry, Il Nuovo Cimento (1955–1965), vol. 6, Supplement 1, pp. 356–380, 1957, doi:10.1007/BF02724793 (preview)
- M. Schönberg, S. Chandrasekhar: On the Evolution of the Main-Sequence Stars, Astrophysical Journal, vol. 96, no. p. 161 ff., 1942, fulltext

== Legacy ==
- Mario Schenberg Graviton, a spherical, resonant-mass, gravitational wave detector.

| Preceded by José Goldemberg | President of the Brazilian Society of Physics; 1979–1981 | Succeeded by Herch Moysés Nussenzveig |
