= Brazilian Physical Society =

Brazilian scientific society

The Brazilian Physical Society (Portuguese: Sociedade Brasileira de Física, SBF) is a non-profit organization of physicists and physics teachers, affiliated with the Brazilian Society for the Progress of Science (Sociedade Brasileira para o Progresso da Ciência - SBPC). Its main missions are to promote the advancement and dissemination of knowledge in physics and science; to defend academic freedom, as well as the interests and rights of professionals in physics, and to contribute to initiatives and public policies aiming to improve the training and harnessing of physics teachers and physicists to help the scientific and technological development of Brazil.

== History and activities ==
The SBF was founded on July 14, 1966. The founding act took place during the XVIII Annual Meeting of the SBPC in Blumenau (Santa Catarina - SC) and was led by José Goldemberg, at the time the secretary of the Physics Commission of the SBPC Meeting. The SBF’s first president was Oscar Sala. The Society is located in the city of São Paulo.

Since its foundation, the SBF has organized national meetings in all fields of physics, either annually or biennially.

The Brazilian Physics Society publishes three journals:

Brazilian Journal of Physics (since 1971)

Revista Brasileira de Ensino de Física (since 1979) - an open access journal devoted to the improvement of Physics teaching at all academic levels – mainly in Portuguese

A Física na Escola (since 2000) - a journal in Portuguese with focus on Physics teaching

and an electronic weekly Bulletin with physics news. The Society has also published several books and studies about the history and evolution of Physics in Brazil. From 1995 to 2006 the SBF has published the Revista de Física Aplicada e Instrumentação.

Since 2014, SBF coordinates the Professional Master’s Degree in Physics Education (Mestrado Nacional Profissional em Ensino de Física - MNPEF, in Portuguese), an initiative devoted to improving the training of elementary and high school teachers in all regions of Brazil.

The Society organizes the Brazilian Physics Olympiad (Olimpíada Brasileira de Física - OBF, in Portuguese) and the Brazilian Physics Olympiad in Public Schools (Olimpíada Brasileira de Física nas Escolas Públicas – OBFEP, in Portuguese), activities that involve about 265,000 students every year.

== Members ==
SBF has more than 5,000 members, grouped into three categories: aspiring (undergraduate students), regular (professionals), and effective (members with the doctoral degree).

== Divisions ==
SBF has 12 Divisions that represent the wide range of interests of the physics community in Brazil. The main goals of the SBF divisions are to promote the development of research and to propose activities related to the different areas of Physics, nationally and in thematic events. They are:

Atomic & Molecular

Biological Physics

Statistical Physics

Industrial Physics

Mathematical Physics

Condensed Matter Physics

Medical Physics

Optics and Photonics

Research in Physics Education

Plasma Physics

Particles and Fields

Nuclear Physics

== Prizes and awards ==
SBF awards five different prizes every year:

José Leite Lopes Prize, for best PhD Thesis;

Carolina Nemes Prize, for outstanding women in the early stages of the career;

Joaquim da Costa Ribeiro Prize, for career-long outstanding contributions in condensed matter physics and materials sciences

Ernesto Hamburger Prize, for important contributions to popularization and dissemination of Physics in Brazil.

Anselmo Salles Paschoa Prize, excellence in research prize for Afro-Brazilian physicists

== Presidents ==
Since its foundation, SBF has had the following Presidents:

Oscar Sala (1966-1967)

José Leite Lopes (1967-1971)

Alceu G. Pinho Filho (1971-1975)

José Goldemberg (1975-1979)

Mario Schenberg (1979-1981)

Herch Moysés Nussenzveig (1981-1983)

Fernando de Souza Barros (1983-1985)

Ramayana Gazzinelli (1985-1987)

Gil da Costa Marques (1987-1991)

Fernando Claudio Zawislak (1991-1993)

Francisco Cesar Sá Barreto (1993-1997)

Humberto Siqueira Brandi (1999-2001)

José Roberto Leite (2001-2003)

Adalberto Fazzio (2003-2007)

Alaor Silvério Chaves (2007-2009)

Celso Pinto de Melo (2009-2013)

Ricardo Magnus Osório Galvão (2013-2016)

Belita Koiller (2016-2017)

Marcos Assunção Pimenta (2017-2019)

Rogério Rosenfeld (2019-2021)

Débora Peres Menezes (2021-2023)
