= Jayme Tiomno =

Brazilian physicist (1920–2011)

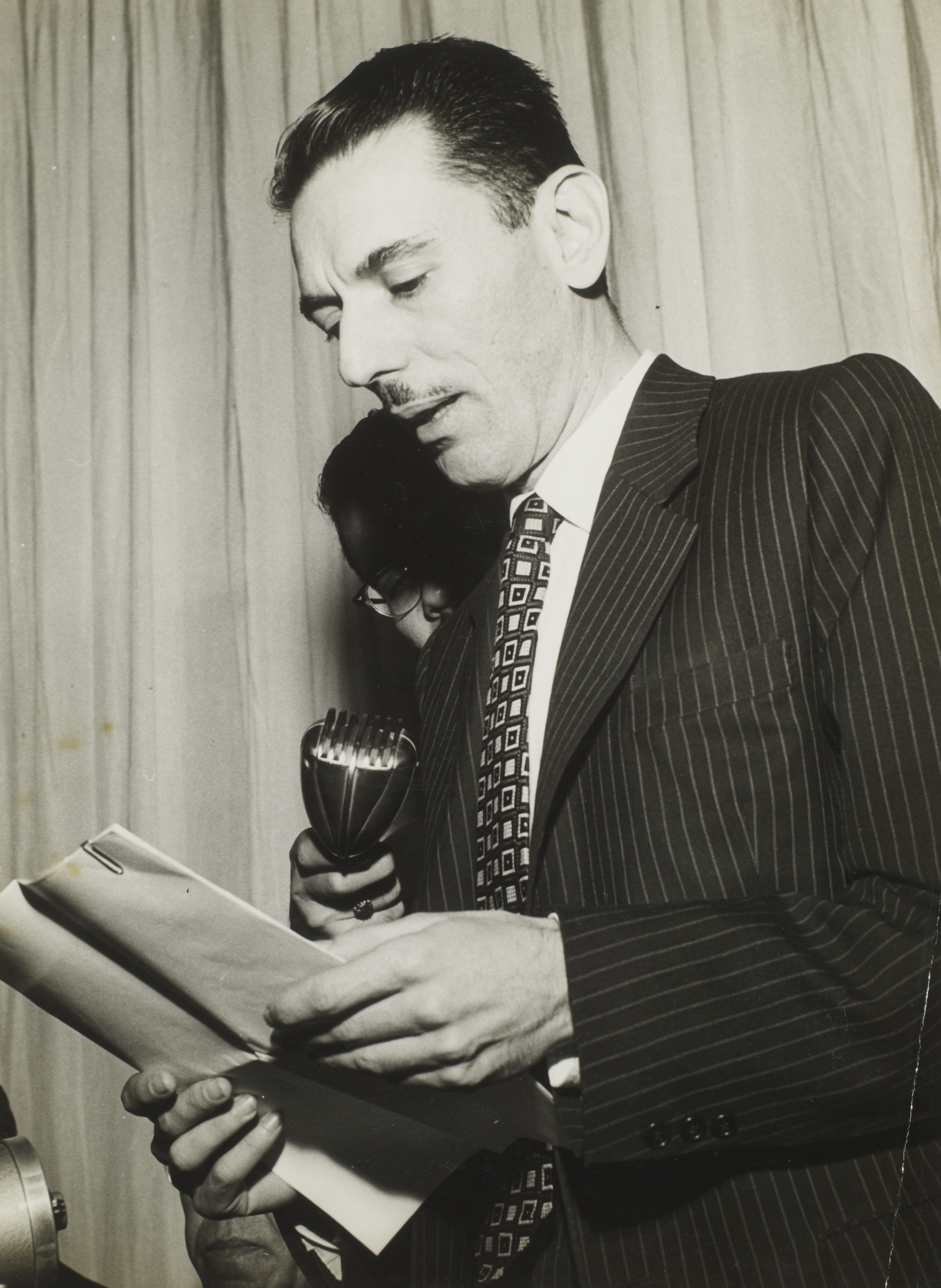
Jayme Tiomno

Jayme Tiomno (April 16, 1920 in Rio de Janeiro – January 12, 2011 in Rio de Janeiro) was a Brazilian experimental and theoretical physicist with interests in particle physics and general relativity. He was member of the Brazilian Academy of Sciences and a recipient of the Brazilian Order of Scientific Merit. He was the son of Jewish Russian immigrants.

He was a founder of the CBPF - Centro Brasileiro de Pesquisas Físicas (Brazilian Center of Physics Research) and one responsible for the creation of the Brazilian Physical Society. In 1965, invited by Darcy Ribeiro, he became professor at the University of Brasília, but was later mandatorily retired by the military regime.

== Selected bibliography ==
- Tiomno, J.; Wheeler, John A. (1949-01-01). "Energy Spectrum of Electrons from Meson Decay". Reviews of Modern Physics. 21 (1). American Physical Society (APS): 144–152. Bibcode:1949RvMP...21..144T. doi:10.1103/revmodphys.21.144. ISSN 0034-6861.
- Tiomno, J.; Wheeler, John A. (1949-01-01). "Charge-Exchange Reaction of the μ-Meson with the Nucleus". Reviews of Modern Physics. 21 (1). American Physical Society (APS): 153–165. Bibcode:1949RvMP...21..153T. doi:10.1103/revmodphys.21.153. ISSN 0034-6861.
- Yang, C. N.; Tiomno, J. (1950-08-01). "Reflection Properties of Spin ½ Fields and a Universal Fermi-Type Interaction". Physical Review. 79 (3). American Physical Society (APS): 495–498. Bibcode:1950PhRv...79..495Y. doi:10.1103/physrev.79.495. ISSN 0031-899X.
- Tiomno, J. (1957). "Non conservation of parity and the universal fermi interaction". Il Nuovo Cimento. 6 (4). Springer Science and Business Media LLC: 912–916. Bibcode:1957NCim....6..912T. doi:10.1007/bf02745816. ISSN 0029-6341. S2CID 119853570.
- Tiomno, J.; Videira, A. L. L.; Zagury, N. (1961-02-01). "Possible Existence of a New K′ Meson". Physical Review Letters. 6 (3). American Physical Society (APS): 120–123. Bibcode:1961PhRvL...6..120T. doi:10.1103/physrevlett.6.120.2. ISSN 0031-9007.
- Rebouças, M. J.; Tiomno, J. (1983-09-15). "Homogeneity of Riemannian space-times of Gödel type". Physical Review D. 28 (6). American Physical Society (APS): 1251–1264. Bibcode:1983PhRvD..28.1251R. doi:10.1103/physrevd.28.1251. ISSN 0556-2821.
- Rebouças, M. J.; Tiomno, J. (1985). "A class of inhomogeneous Gödel-type models". Il Nuovo Cimento B. Series 11. 90 (2). Springer Science and Business Media LLC: 204–210. Bibcode:1985NCimB..90..204R. doi:10.1007/bf02722906. ISSN 1826-9877. S2CID 117065819.
- Calvão, M. O.; Damião Soares, I.; Tiomno, J. (1990). "Geodesics in Gödel-type space-times". General Relativity and Gravitation. 22 (6). Springer Science and Business Media LLC: 683–705. Bibcode:1990GReGr..22..683C. doi:10.1007/bf00755988. ISSN 0001-7701. S2CID 119413203.
- Figueiredo, B D B; Soares, I Damiao; Tiomno, J (1992-06-01). "Gravitational coupling of Klein-Gordon and Dirac particles to matter vorticity and spacetime torsion". Classical and Quantum Gravity. 9 (6). IOP Publishing: 1593–1617. Bibcode:1992CQGra...9.1593F. doi:10.1088/0264-9381/9/6/015. ISSN 0264-9381. S2CID 250887589.
