= List of University of São Paulo alumni =

This is a list of notable persons who have graduated from the University of São Paulo.

== Presidents of Brazil ==
- Prudente de Morais (1894–1898) - Law
- Campos Sales (1898–1902) - Law
- Rodrigues Alves (1902–1906) - Law
- Afonso Pena (1906–1909) - Law
- Venceslau Brás (1914–1918) - Law
- Delfim Moreira (1918–1919) - Law
- Washington Luís (1926–1930) - Law
- Júlio Prestes (1930) - Law
- José Linhares (1945–1946) - Law
- Nereu Ramos (1955–1956) - Law
- Jânio Quadros (1961) - Law
- Fernando Henrique Cardoso (1995–2003) - Social Sciences
- Michel Temer (2016–2018) - Law

== São Paulo state governors ==
- Jânio Quadros (1955–1959)
- Abreu Sodré (1967–1971)
- Paulo Maluf (1979–1982)
- André Franco Montoro (1983–1987)
- Mário Covas (1995–2001)
- Cláudio Lembo (2005)
- José Serra (2006–2010)
- Alberto Goldman (2010)

== Politicians ==
- Fernando Haddad - former Minister of Education of Brazil; former mayor of São Paulo (law degree)
- Gilberto Kassab - former mayor of São Paulo (engineering and economics degree)
- Guido Mantega - former Finance Minister of Brazil (economics degree)
- Aloizio Mercadante - current Minister of Education of Brazil (economics degree)
- Antonio Palocci - former Minister of Civil House of Brazil (M.D. degree)
- Rubens Ricupero - former Finance Minister of Brazil and Minister of the Environment and Amazonian Affairs (law degree)

== Writers, authors ==
- Cesar Calejon, journalist and writer
- Antonio Candido, writer and literary critic
- Augusto de Campos
- Haroldo de Campos, poet, critic, professor, and translator
- Hilda Hilst, poet, novelist, and playwright
- Glauco Mattoso
- Raduan Nassar
- Décio Pignatari, poet, essayist and translator
- Paulo Emílio Salles Gomes
- Lygia Fagundes Telles, novelist and writer

== Scientists and physicians ==
- Aziz Nacib Ab'Saber - archaeologist, geographer, geologist and ecologist
- Ennio Candotti - physicist and scientific leader
- Marcelo Damy - physicist and co-discoverer of mesons in cosmic ray showers
- Abrahão de Moraes - physicist
- Gilberto de Nucci - physician and experimental pharmacologist
- Sérgio Henrique Ferreira - physician and pharmacologist, discovered the active principle of a new drug against hypertension
- Miguel Mies - oceanographer and research scientist
- José Goldemberg - scientific leader and research scientist
- José Graziano da Silva - agronomist and Director General of the Food and Agriculture Organization (2012-2015)
- Adib Domingos Jatene - physician
- Dr. Jalma Jurado - physician known for pioneering work on gender-affirming surgery in Brazil
- Warwick Estevam Kerr - geneticist, researcher on the biology and genetics of bees
- Marta Mirazón Lahr - human evolutionary biologist and anthropologist
- César Lattes - physicist, co-discoverer of the pi meson
- José Leite Lopes - theoretical physicist
- Euripedes Constantino Miguel - psychiatrist, later returned to Faculty of FMUSP
- Carlos Augusto Monteiro - nutrition, preventive medicine, public health
- José E. Moreira - system software architect for Blue Gene/L, the fastest supercomputer in the world
- Dr. Miguel Nicolelis - physician and neurobiological researcher
- Lucila Ohno-Machado - biomedical engineer and chair of the Department of Biomedical Informatics at UC San Diego
- Merav Opher - Astronomer and space physicist
- Vivian Pellizari - Antarctic researcher and microbiologist
- Silvano Raia - Brazilian surgeon
- Dr. Renato M. E. Sabbatini - neuroscientist and physiologist
- Oscar Sala - Italian-Brazilian nuclear physicist
- Maria Léa Salgado-Labouriau - Brazilian scientist who specialized in palaeobotany
- Roberto Salmeron - electrical engineer and experimental nuclear physicist
- Mário Schenberg - physicist
- Evelyna Bloem Souto - only woman in the first class of the civil engineering course at the University of São Paulo, civil engineer, academic.
- Andréa Sardinha Taschetto - climate change scientist
- Jayme Tiomno - experimental and theoretical nuclear physicist
- Marcos Troyjo - social scientist, political economist and diplomat
- Drauzio Varella - physician, educator and medical science popularizer
- Mayana Zatz - molecular biologist and geneticist
- Euryclides de Jesus Zerbini - medical doctor; did the first heart transplantation in Latin America

== Others ==
- João Batista Vilanova Artigas - architect (architecture degree)
- Paulo Autran - actor (law degree)
- Amaury Bier - Economist
- William Bonner - journalist (advertising degree)
- Chico Buarque de Holanda - singer (architecture degree)
- José Celso Martinez Corrêa - playwright (law degree)
- Chavoso da USP - YouTuber and speaker
- Luiza Coppieters, LGBTQ+ activist, professor, and local politician (philosophy degree)
- Amyr Klink - sailor and explorer (economics degree)
- Fernando Meirelles - film director, City of God, The Constant Gardener and Blindness (architecture degree)
- Henrique Meirelles - former president of the Central Bank of Brazil (engineering degree)
- Matheus Nachtergaele - actor (dramatic arts degree)
- Sebastião Salgado - photographer and photojournalist (economics degree)
- Nelson Pereira dos Santos - filmmaker (law degree)
- Alexandre Schwartsman - economist (M.S.), former Director of the Central Bank of Brazil
- Sócrates - former Brazil national football team football player (medicine degree)
- Dan Stulbach - actor (dramatic arts degree)
- Marcelo Tas - actor and writer (engineering degree)
- Cilene Victor - journalist, professor, and commentator
