= List of University of São Paulo faculty =

This is a list of professors from the University of São Paulo.

- Aziz Ab'Saber
- Vahan Agopyan
- Tullio Ascarelli
- Ana Fani Alessandri Carlos
- Paul Arbousse-Bastide
- Robert Henri Aubreton (he also received an honorary degree)
- Roger Bastide
- Fernand Braudel
- David Bohm
- Antonio Candido
- Fernando Henrique Cardoso, former President of Brazil
- Paulo C. Chagas
- François Châtelet
- João Cruz Costa
- Newton da Costa
- Sérgio Buarque de Holanda
- Jean Dieudonné
- Alessandro Donati
- Luigi Fantappiè
- Clóvis de Barros Filho
- Henrique Fleming
- Vilém Flusser
- Luciano da Fontoura Costa
- Johann Julius Gottfried Ludwig Frank or Julius Frank (1834–1841)
- Giorgio Eugenio Oscare Giacaglia
- Ernesto Giesbrecht
- Victor Goldschmidt
- Gilles Gaston Granger
- Ada Pellegrini Grinover
- Martial Guéroult
- Ernst Wolfgang Hamburger
- Heinrich Hauptman
- Felix Hegg
- Heinz Dieter Heidemann
- Iacov Hillel
- Paul Hugon
- István Jancsó
- Warwick Kerr
- Bernardo Kucinski
- César Lattes
- Gérard Lebrun
- Claude Lévi-Strauss
- José Eduardo Martins
- Armen Mamigonian
- Jean Maugüe
- Lambert Meyer
- Euripedes Constantino Miguel
- Pierre Monbeig
- Carlos Augusto Monteiro
- Herch Moysés Nussenzveig
- Giuseppe Occhialini
- Décio Pignatari
- Jaime Pinsky
- Heinrich Rheinboldt
- Anatol Rosenfeld
- Emir Sader
- Milton Santos
- Egon Schaden
- Mário Schenberg
- Valdemar Setzer
- Evelyna Bloem Souto
- Larry Thompson, chemist
- Kokei Uehara
- Giuseppe Ungaretti
- Jean-Pierre Vernant
- Claus Leon Warschauer
- Gleb Wataghin
- Emilio Willems
