= Adib Jatene =

Brazilian physician of Lebanese background

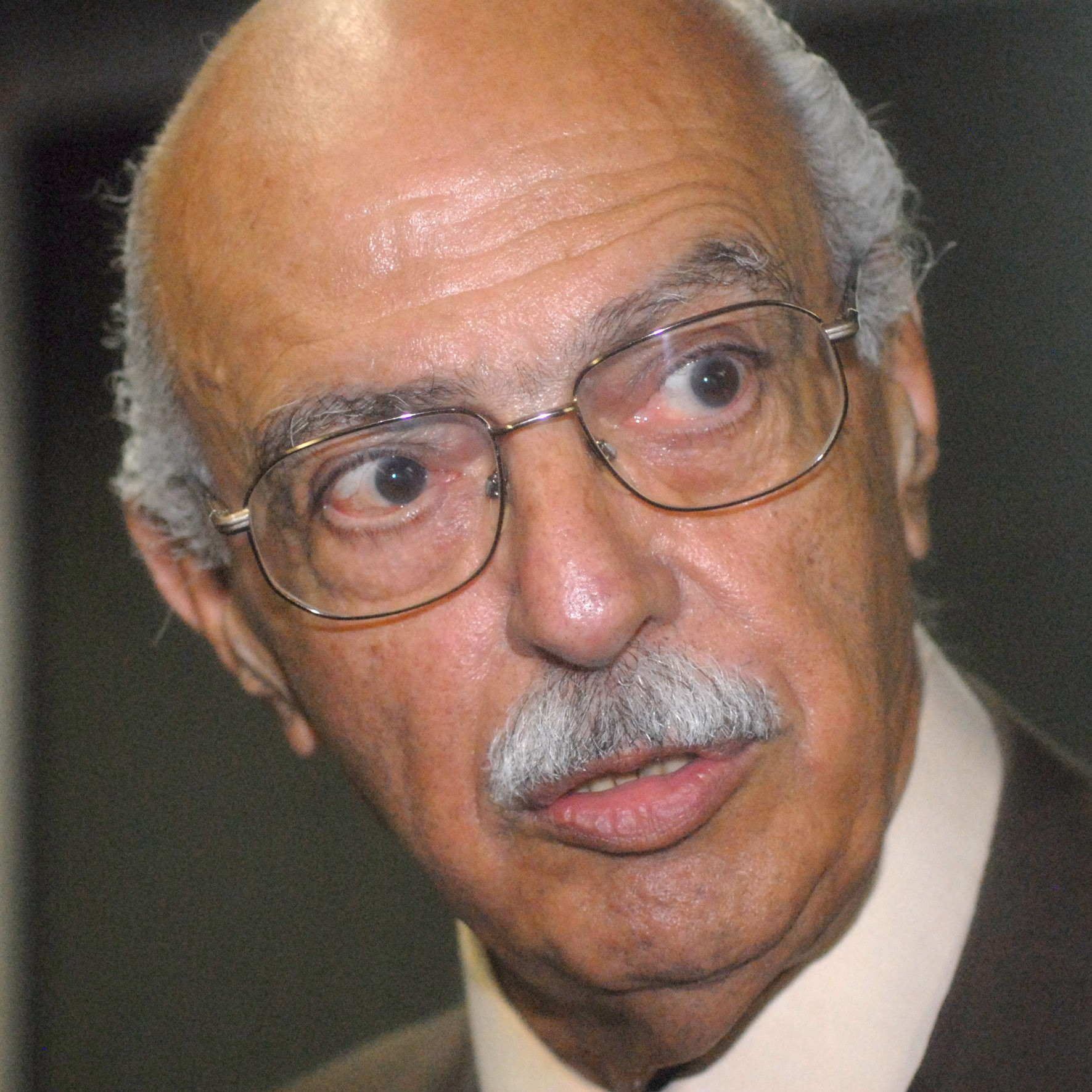
- Born: June 4, 1929; Xapuri, Acre, Brazil
- Died: November 14, 2014 (aged 85); São Paulo, Brazil
- Education: University of Sao Paulo

Adib Domingos Jatene (June 4, 1929 – November 14, 2014) was a noted Brazilian physician of Lebanese background, university professor, scientist and thoracic surgeon. He is remembered as the inventor of the arterial switch operation (sometimes called the Jatene arterial switch), a surgical technique to correct transposition of the great vessels in the newborn.

== Early life and education ==
Jatene was born on June 4, 1929, in the city of Xapuri in the Brazilian state Acre. He was the son of Lebanese immigrants, Domingos Antonio Jatene and Anice Adib Jatene. His father was a merchant who traded with rubber tappers. Jatene's father died from yellow fever when Jatene was 2 years old. The family subsequently moved to the city Uberlândia in the Brazilian state Minas Gerais where his mother established a business.

In 1947, Jatene then moved to São Paulo, where he studied sciences at the Colégio Bandeirantes de São Paulo. At the age of 23, Jatene graduated from the University of São Paulo Faculty of Medicine. After graduation, he remained in São Paulo for two years of cardiac surgery training at the São Paulo University Hospital under the guidance of Euryclides de Jesus Zerbini until 1955.

== Career ==
Jatene was one of the founders of the University of São Paulo Heart Institute

He became Secretary of Health of the city of São Paulo and later Minister of Health of Brazil for both the Fernando Collor de Mello and Fernando Henrique Cardoso administrations. During his time as minister, he idealized the CPMF tax aimed at financing the health system.

He was a member of the Brazilian Academy of Medicine, and has published over 270 scientific academic studies.

== Death ==
Jatene died on November 14, 2014, of a heart attack in São Paulo, Brazil, aged 85.
