= FUVEST =

Educational institution in Brazil

FUVEST (from Portuguese Fundação Universitária para o Vestibular, "University Foundation for Vestibular") is a Brazilian autonomous institution connected to the University of São Paulo responsible for its "vestibular" examinations. For that reason, USP's vestibular itself is usually called "Fuvest".

FUVEST's exam is considered by most as the most competitive vestibular and demanding exam, only rivalled by the vestibular for the Technological Institute of Aeronautics. Every year, an average of 160,000 candidates take their exams, which usually last several days.

== Tests ==
FUVEST's exam is split into two parts. The first part consists of a 90 multiple–choice questions test, taken by all applicants (nicknamed as vestibulandos in Portuguese) in late November, or early December. They have 5 hours to answer the questions about the following subjects: Portuguese language and Brazilian/Portuguese Literature, Math, Physics, Chemistry, Biology, Geography, History, and English language. Also, according to the candidate's guide, up to 10% of these questions will bear interdisciplinary questions.

Following the first part, FUVEST publishes the Nota de Corte (from Portuguese, meaning "Cutoff Mark" or "Cutoff Score"). The Cutoff Score is the result of a simple expression and its value is different for each major. Every candidate who has obtained a score equal to or higher than the Cutoff Mark automatically qualifies to advance to the second part. Candidates who score less than 22 points or score zero in any subject are automatically disqualified.

The second part is usually held in late December or early January and consists of up to four exams. The Portuguese exam is required of all candidates, and so is an exam about all subjects. The remaining required exams (on the third day of this second part) differ depending on the candidate's intended major, usually focusing on more difficult or specific topics. For example, prospective Engineering majors are tested in Math, Physics and Chemistry, while Law School applicants have to take History, Geography and Math exams, and Medical School candidates are examined in Physics, Chemistry and Biology. The Portuguese language exam includes, in addition to essay questions, a student-written essay. In the current format, candidates take only one exam per day over a period of three or four days. Some majors also require specific exams: applicants for Architecture, Design and Arts must attend for such tests.

Moreover, candidates who only attended a public high-school receive an extra 12% on their final scores on the first and second parts, arguably in order to compensate for the general low quality of Brazilian public basic education.

=== 2010 changes ===
For the 2010 FUVEST, some significant changes are expected. The first part, scheduled for November 22, will be the same as before, but the points obtained by the candidate will no longer be taken into consideration for his final score. In other words, the first part will serve as an elimination test.

For the second part, greater changes have been made. The examination will last for three consecutive days (from January 3 to 5). In the first day, candidates will do the Portuguese language test and the essay exam. On the second day, there will be 18 write-in questions covering all subjects of high school, 6 being interdisciplinary. In the third day, specific questions will be presented in the exam to the candidate, depending on his career of choice. For example, students applying for any course in the Humanities will be asked and questioned about subjects regarding the humanities such as history, or geography, while candidates for the Exact Sciences will be questioned about subjects such as mathematics and chemistry, and so on and so forth.

Careers that require special tests (such as Music or Architecture) will have their own specific tests regarding the desired subjects of the candidates at a time around the end of the year.

==== Required books ====
Candidates are requested to read a total of nine books, due to the fact that the exams will present questions regarding the stated books. Not all of them will be covered by the test, usually only three are mentioned throughout the test, but the student is unable to know which of them he will be asked about. For the 2023 exam, the required books are:

- Poemas Escolhidos – Gregório de Matos
- Quincas Borba – Machado de Assis
- Alguma poesia – Carlos Drummond de Andrade
- Angústia – Graciliano Ramos
- Mensagem – Fernando Pessoa
- Terra Sonâmbula – Mia Couto
- Campo Geral – Guimarães Rosa
- Romanceiro da Inconfidência- Cecília Meireles
- Nove Noites – Bernardo Carvalho

In FUVEST 2024, the books Poemas Escolhidos, Terra Sonâmbula, and Nove Noites will be replaced by the following three books:

- Marília de Dirceu - Tomás Antônio Gonzaga
- Nós matamos o cão tinhoso! – Luís Bernardo Honwana
- Dois irmãos – Milton Hatoum

In 2025, Angústia, Mensagem, and Campo Geral will be replaced by:

- Os ratos – Dyonélio Machado
- A Ilustre Casa de Ramires – Eça de Queirós
- Água Funda – Ruth Guimarães

In 2026, Quincas Borba, Alguma poesia, and Romanceiro da Inconfidência will be replaced by:

- Primeiros Cantos – Gonçalves Dias
- Várias Histórias – Machado de Assis
- Amar, Verbo Intransitivo – Mário de Andrade
