= Heinrich Rheinboldt =

German-Brazilian chemist

Heinrich Rheinboldt (August 11, 1891 – December 5, 1955) was a German-born Brazilian chemist and professor. He was one of the founders of the Institute of Chemistry of the University of São Paulo. His contributions span the fields of inorganic and organic chemistry, physical chemistry, materials science, and the history and teaching of chemistry.

== Biography ==
=== Early life ===
Born in Karlsruhe, he was the son of diplomat Joseph Rheinboldt, who served as Minister of Transport and as a consul in Switzerland, and the maternal grandson of chemist Heinrich Caro, who was responsible for isolating peroxymonosulfuric acid. Influenced by his grandfather, whom he considered his ''spiritual guide'', Rheinboldt enrolled in 1910 in the course of geology and chemistry at the Karlsruhe Institute of Technology. He later transferred to the University of Strasbourg, from which he graduated in 1918. During his period as a student, Rheinboldt researched the adsorption in inorganic gels, publishing articles in collaboration with Edgar Wedekind.

=== Career ===
After the German defeat in World War I, Rheinboldt moved back to Karlsruhe, where he began working as an assistant to Paul Pfeiffer at KIT. In 1922, they were relocated to the University of Bonn. After obtaining his habilitation in 1924, Rheinboldt began supervising doctoral theses. He was appointed professor in March 1930 and taught analytical and inorganic chemistry and eventually became director of the Inorganic Analytic Department. Following the ascension of Adolf Hitler to power, Rheinboldt faced pressure due to his Jewish ancestry. In 1934, he published the book Chemische Unterrichtsversuche, on the teaching and learning of chemistry. That same year, he accepted an invitation to join the University of São Paulo, where he was entrusted with helping establish the chemistry program.

==== Activity in São Paulo ====
Arriving in June 1934 with fellow scientists Felix Rawitscher and Ernst Bresslau, Rheinboldt encountered the Faculty of Philosophy, Science and Letters in a precarious situation. He dedicated the following months to helping set up its facilities, including rooms. Classes started in March 1935, with Rheinboldt initially teaching them in simple and slow French. He introduced experimental classes and contributed to the building of laboratories with chemical material he had brought from his grandfather's collection. His students included Ernesto Giesbrecht, who was awarded the National Order of Scientific Merit.

In 1937, Rheinboldt authored a manual of chemical nomenclature in Portuguese. Together with Herbert Stettiner and Heinrich Hauptmann, he worked to found the Department of Chemistry, which later became the modern Institute of Chemistry of the University of São Paulo. He was a member of the Brazilian Association of Chemistry.
