= Cilene Victor =

Brazilian TV commentator and journalist

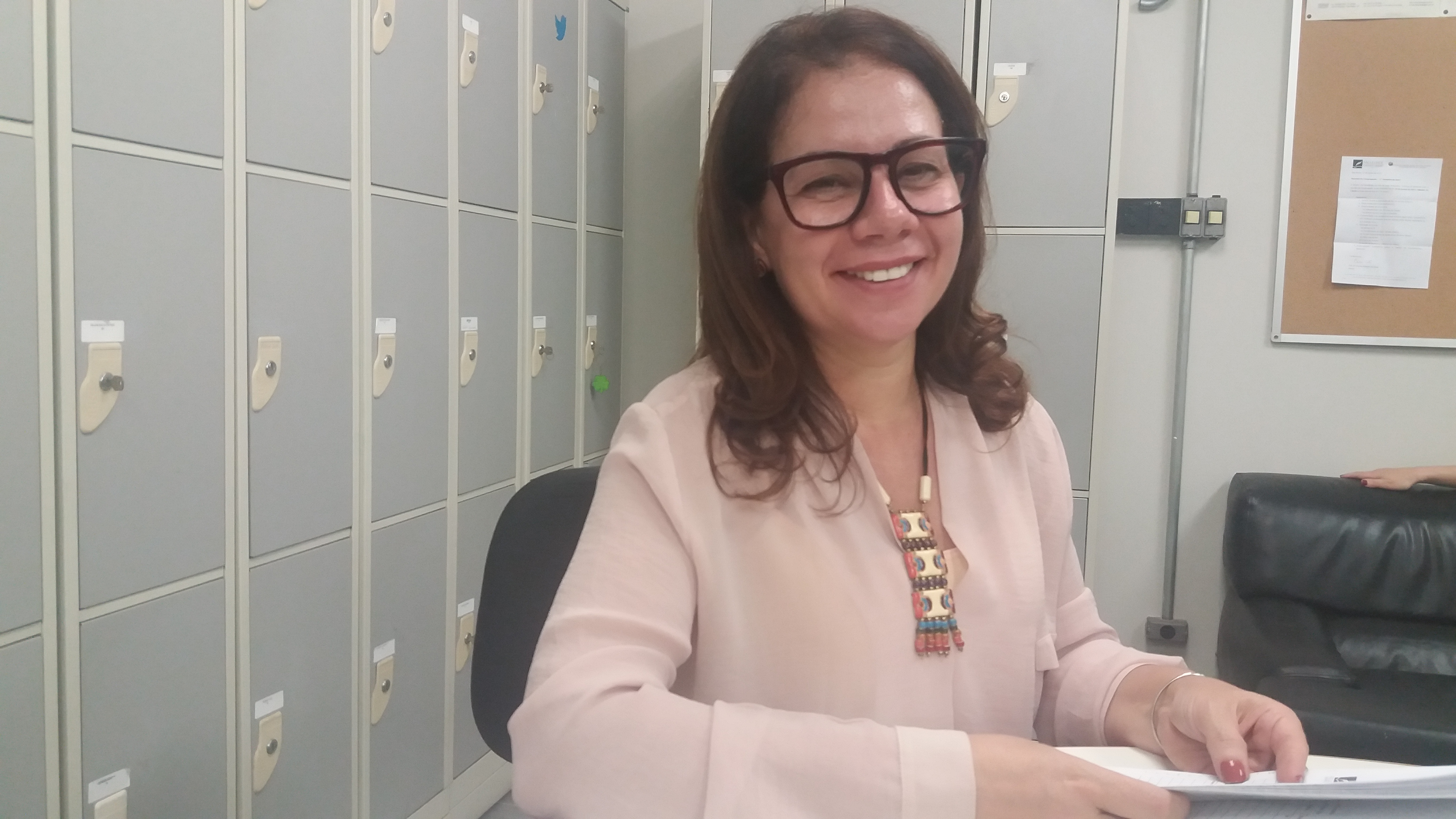
- Cilene Victor, in 2017
- Born: June 14, 1968 (age 57); Canto do Buriti
- Occupations: Journalist, professor, commentator

Cilene Victor da Silva (14 June 1968, Canto do Buriti) is a journalist, professor, and a Brazilian TV commentator. She teaches journalism at Faculdade Cásper Líbero, Brazil, and she provides commentary for Jornal da Cultura. She has a PhD in Public health from the University of São Paulo, with reference to communication of disaster risks through science journalism and environmental journalism.

For increasing awareness of disaster risks and her contribution to civil defence, she received the Civil Defense Medal of the Government of the State of São Paulo, and the National Civil Defence Medal at the level of Cavaleiro from the Ministry of National Integration.
