= School of Arts, Sciences, and Humanities at the University of São Paulo =

- Escola de Artes, Ciências e Humanidades da Universidade de São Paulo
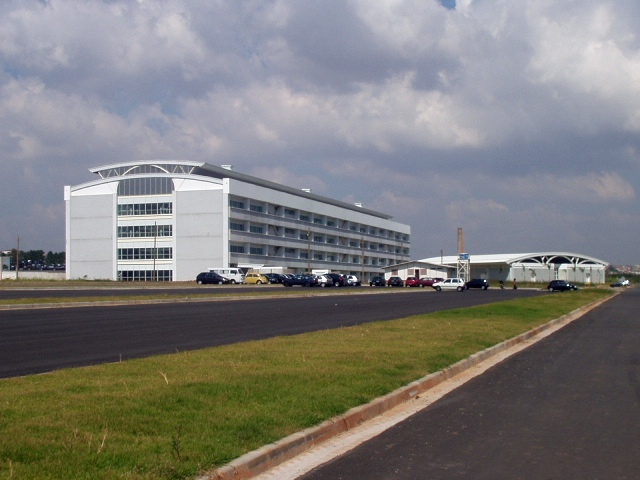
- Type: Public
- Location: São Paulo, São Paulo State, Brazil

The School of Arts, Sciences, and Humanities at the University of São Paulo (Portuguese: Escola de Artes, Ciências e Humanidades da Universidade de São Paulo, EACH or EACH-USP) is a unit of the University of São Paulo located in the campus USP Leste, involved with research, teaching, and extension of services in HASS, computer sciences biotechnology and related sciences.

The EACH campus, located at São Paulo, in the São Paulo State, has eleven undergraduate and ten graduate programs. In addition, EACH keeps exchange agreements with many other institutions of the world and welcomes exchange students of several nationalities. The EACH was founded in 2005.

The EACH-USP plays an important role in social inclusion by expanding access to higher education for the poorest populations in the city of São Paulo, promoting the empowerment of these vulnerable communities. The importance of this unit as a result of political participation deconstructs the spatial logic by which the Brazilian urban periphery is understood as a space of absence of such establishments.

== Undergraduate Courses ==
- Marketing;
- Health and physical education;
- Management of Public Policies;
- Biotechnology;
- Environmental management;
- Information Systems;
- Gerontology;
- Textile and Fashion;
- Obstetrics;
- Natural sciences education;
- Leisure and Tourism.

== Graduate programs ==
- Marketing;
- Biochemistry and Molecular Biology (Bioquímica e Biologia Molecular);
- Physical Activity Sciences (Ciências da Atividade Física);
- Cultural Studies (Estudos Culturais);
- Public Policy (Gestão de Políticas Públicas);
- Modeling of complex systems (Modelagem de Sistemas Complexos);
- Social Change and Political Participation (Mudança Social e Participação Política);
- Information systems (Sistemas de Informação);
- Sustainability (Sustentabilidade);
- Textile and Fashion (Têxtil e Moda);
- Tourism (Turismo).

== Education and public outreach ==
=== Popular course (Cursinho popular da EACH) ===
The main education and public outreach (EPO) activity of EACH is a popular course offered by USP' students. This popular course is a pre-university course seek out pre-college course (prep course).

=== University Open to the Elderly (Universidade Aberta à Terceira Idade or UnATI) ===
The Open University for the Elderly is a university extension project of EACH-USP that seeks to offer free courses for the elderly. It is a social inclusion project for the elderly, carrying out educational activities in the areas of health, sports and citizenship.

== International cooperation ==
The EACH has academic partnership with several universities around the world, such as:

- University of Wollongong (Australia);
- University of Cape Verde (Cabo Verde);.
- Universidad del Quíndio (Colombia);
- Université de Rennes 2 (France);
- University of West Attica (Greece);
- Università degli Studi di Parma (Italy);
- Universidad Estatal del Valle de Ecatepec (Mexico);
- Universidade do Minho (Portugal);
- Universitat de Girona (Spain);
- Universitat de les Illes Balears (Spain);
- Universidade da Coruña (Spain);
- Universidad Pablo de Olavide, de Sevilla (Spain);
- Universidad Nacional de Frontera (Peru).

== Notable professors ==
- Eduardo Suplicy (Visiting lecturer).
