= Miguel Mies =

Brazilian academic, oceanographer and researcher

- Born: 1986 or 1987 (age 39–40); Brazil
- Occupations: Oceanographer, climate scientist and academic
- Known for: Research on coral bleaching and the responses of South Atlantic coral reefs to climate change

Academic background
- Education: University of São Paulo (PhD)
- Thesis: The symbiotic relationship between Symbiodinium and coral reef larvae: gene expression, fatty acid biochemistry and responses to thermal stress (2019)

Academic work
- Discipline: Oceanography; Climate science
- Sub-discipline: Coral reef ecology, coral bleaching, marine biology, molecular biology, and genetics of zooxanthellae
- Institutions: University of São Paulo; Coral Reefs and Climate Change Laboratory; Coral Vivo Project; Coral Vivo Institute
- Website: miguelmies.com.br

Miguel Mies is an oceanographer and climate scientist specializing in coral bleaching. He is currently a professor at the Oceanographic Institute of the University of São Paulo (IO-USP) and leads the Coral Reefs and Climate Change Laboratory (LARC). He is also the research coordinator for the Coral Vivo Project and is the vice president of the Coral Vivo Institute.

== Early life and education ==
Mies was born in Brazil. He holds a BSc and a PhD in oceanography from the Oceanographic Institute of the University of São Paulo (IO-USP). His PhD dissertation focused on the impact of climate change on the molecular relationship between marine invertebrate larvae and their symbionts. It also provided the first demonstration of coral larvae susceptibility to bleaching.

== Career ==
Mies holds a professorship at IO-USP and leads the Coral Reefs and Climate Change Laboratory (LARC). He also serves as the Research Coordinator for the Coral Vivo Project and is the vice president of the Coral Vivo Institute. He was involved as the deputy coordinator for GT7 (Recifes) in response to the oil spill on the Brazilian coast.

During his career, Mies has served as a reviewer for more than 30 international scientific journals and was a member of the editorial board for Frontiers in Marine Science, focusing on coral reef research.

== Research ==
Mies researches subjects such as reef ecology, molecular biology, and genetics of zooxanthellae, larval development of reef organisms, trophic ecology of corals, and the effects of climate change on coral reefs. His research, focused mostly on field and experimental assessments of coral bleaching, spans both global and regional scales. His studies have contributed to the understanding of the unique responses of Brazilian coral reefs to climate change, compared to other reef ecosystems.

== Selected publications ==
- Destri, G; Güth, AZ; Luza, AL; Ibanhez, JY; Dottori, M; Silveira, ICA; Braz, GB; De La Cour, JL; Manzello, DP; Skirving, WJ; Mies, M (2025). "The thermal stress history of South Atlantic reefs reveals increasing intensity, duration, frequency, and likely undocumented bleaching episodes". Global Change Biology. 31 (4) e70162. doi:10.1111/gcb.70162. PMID 40183138.
- Mies, M; Destri, G; Lacerda, CHF; Carvalho, JLM; Ibanhez, JY; Güth, AZ; Luza, AL; Campos, LP; Shimada, AC; Omaki, KNT; Jahn, BE; et al. (2025-09-11). "Coral bleaching and mortality across a 24° latitudinal range in the Southwestern Atlantic during the fourth global bleaching event". Coral Reefs. doi:10.1007/s00338-025-02743-5.
- Mies, M; Francini-Filho, RB; Zilberberg, C; Garrido, AG; Longo, GO; Laurentino, E; Güth, AZ; Sumida, PYG; Banha, TNS (2020-06-25). "South Atlantic coral reefs are major global warming refugia and less susceptible to bleaching". Frontiers in Marine Science. 7 514. doi:10.3389/fmars.2020.00514.
- Corazza, BM; Lacerda, CHF; Güth, AZ; Marcançoli, RKM; Bianchini, A; Calderon, EN; Capel, KCC; Conceição, E; Faria, SC; Francini-Filho, RB; Garrido, AG; Guebert, FM; Kitahara, MV; Longo, GO; Lotufo, TMC; Salvi, KP; Segal, B; Sumida, PYG; Zilberberg, C; Mies, M (2024-04-18). "No coral recovery three years after a major bleaching event in reefs in the Southwestern Atlantic refugium". Marine Biology. 171 114. doi:10.1007/s00227-024-04432-3.
- Mies, M (2019-09-11). "Evolution, diversity, distribution and the endangered future of the giant clam–Symbiodiniaceae association". Coral Reefs. 38 (6): 1067–1084. doi:10.1007/s00338-019-01857-x.
