= Hospital das Clínicas da Universidade de São Paulo =

Hospital das Clínicas da Faculdade de Medicina da Universidade de São Paulo

Geography
- Location: São Paulo, SP, Brazil
- Coordinates: 23.557030°S 46.669848°W

Organisation
- Care system: Public
- Type: Teaching, tertiary referral hospital
- Affiliated university: University of São Paulo

Services
- Emergency department: Yes
- Beds: 2,200

History
- Opened: 19 April 1944; 81 years ago

Links
- Website: www.hc.fm.usp.br
- Lists: Hospitals in Brazil
- Other links: Instituto do Coração da Universidade de São Paulo

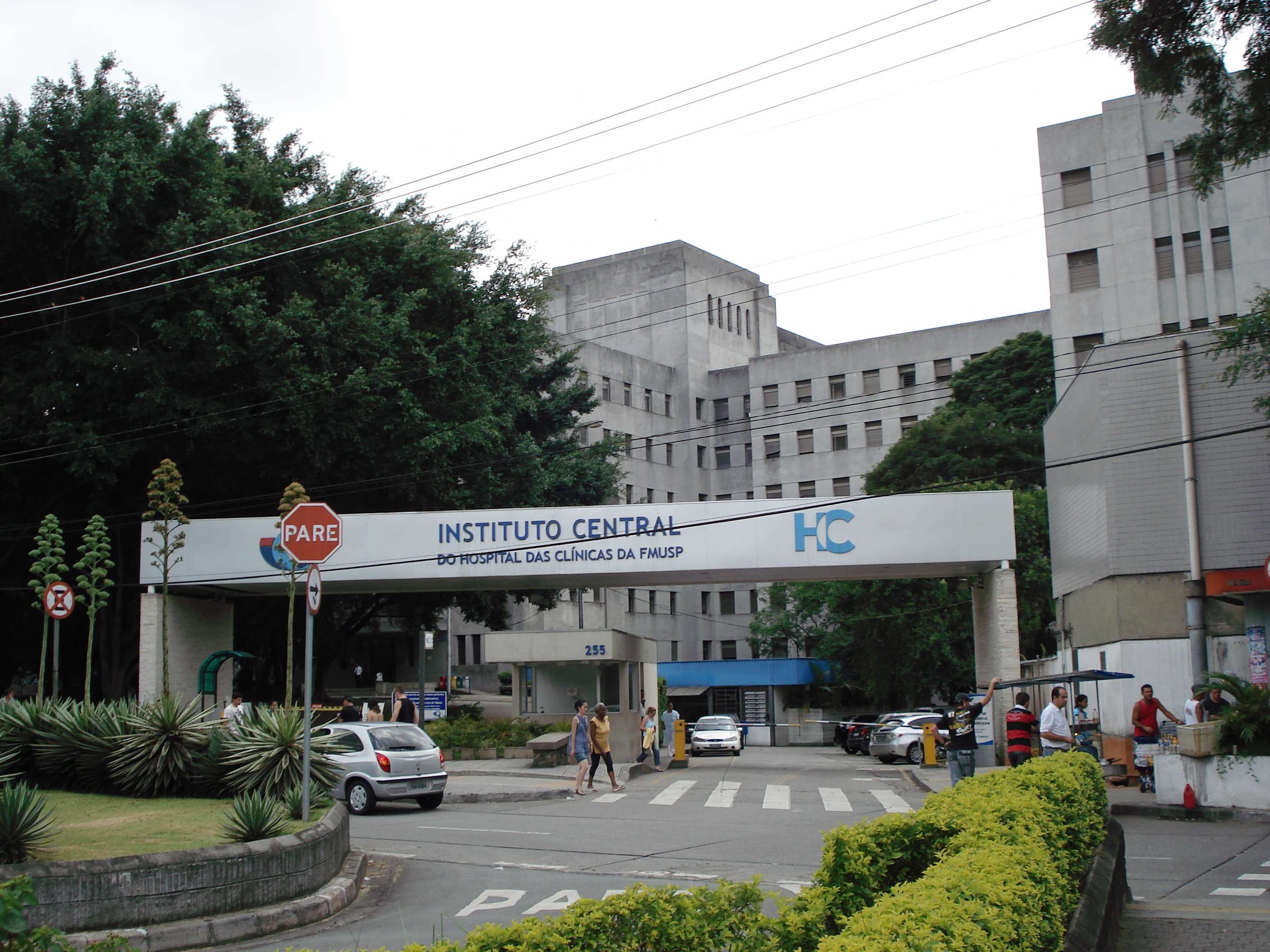
The entry gate of Hospital das Clínicas da Universidade de São Paulo

The Hospital das Clínicas da Faculdade de Medicina da Universidade de São Paulo (University of São Paulo Faculty of Medicine Clinics Hospital) is a complex of health institutions, located in various regions of the city of São Paulo, Brazil. Founded on 19 April 1944, it occupies a total area of 600,000 square meters and offers 2,400 beds, distributed among its eight specialized institutes and two assisting hospitals. The main complex of the institution is also connected to a metro station.

== Buildings, Institutes and assisting hospitals ==
The largest part of the complex, located in the central region of São Paulo in the Consolação district, consists of:

- Administration Building
- Central Institute (ICHC)
- Heart Institute (Instituto do Coração - INCOR)
- Orthopedics and Traumatology Institute (IOT)
- Psychiatry Institute (IPq)
- Radiology Institute (INRAD)
- Children's Institute (Instituto da Criança) (ICr)
- Instituto Dr Arnaldo de Vieira
- Medical Investigation Laboratories (LIM) (building under project, the governor have decided to give the State Secretary of Health building to create this research institute).

Clinics Journal

On other locations, the complex is divided into:

- Suzano Assisting Hospital, located in the town of Suzano;
- Institute of Physical Medicine and Rehabilitation - IMREA (former Division of Rehabilitation Medicine)
- Vila Mariana Unit, located on the southern part of the city of São Paulo;
- Umarizal Unit, located nearby the base;
- Cotoxó Assisting Hospital, located in Vila Pompéia, in the city of São Paulo;
- Medical Investigation Laboratories, administrative unit located in the Cerqueira César district;
- Rebouças convention center, located across the street from the base hospital.
- AIDS House (providing care to HIV/AIDS patients)
- S.A.M.S.S. (Employees' Medical and Social Assistance Service)

== Clinics journal ==
Clinics
- Discipline: Medicine
- Language: English
- Edited by: Prof.Luiz Felipe Pinho Moreira MD-Ph.D

Publication details
- Former name: Revista do Hospital das Clínicas
- History: 1946-present
- Frequency: Monthly
- Impact factor: 2.365 (2020)

Standard abbreviations
- ISO 4: Clinics
- NLM: Clinics (Sao Paulo)

Indexing
- ISSN: 1807-5932 (print); 1980-5322 (web)

Links
- Journal homepage

The hospital publishes Clinics an open access journal. It is edited by Luiz Felipe Pinho Moreira.

=== Abstracting and indexing ===
The journal is indexed and abstracted in the following bibliographic databases:

- Index Medicus/MEDLINE/PubMed
- Scopus
- Science Citation Index
- LILACS
- PubMed Central

== Chronology ==
The base complex and satellite buildings have been built gradually since 1944. The chronology for each institute's starting year follows.

=== Units ===
- Central Institute - 1944
- Psychiatry Institute - 1952
- Orthopedics and Traumatology Institute - 1953
- Administration Building - 1972
- Medical Investigation Laboratories - 1975
- Institute of Physical Medicine and Rehabilitation (former Division of Rehabilitation Medicine)
- Vila Mariana Unit - 1975
- Umarizal Unit - 2001
- Child Institute - 1976
- Heart Institute - 1977
- Ambulatory Building - 1981
- Rebouças Convention Center - 1982
- AIDS House - 1994
- Radiology Institute - 1994
- Cancer Institute - 2008

=== Assisting hospitals ===
- Suzano Assisting Hospital - 1960
- Cotoxó Assisting Hospital - 1971
