= Massachusetts General Hospital Psychiatry Academy =

The Massachusetts General Hospital Psychiatry Academy is an educational organization for psychiatrists, psychologists, other mental health professionals, and other healthcare professionals (like registered nurses, social workers, and school counselors) who diagnose and treat patients with mental health disorders. It is directly organized and managed by the Department of Psychiatry at Massachusetts General Hospital, which is owned by Mass General Brigham, the largest healthcare provider in Massachusetts.

The Psychiatry Academy organizes and produces CME activities—like one-day live symposia and online webcasts—that educate attendees about effective clinical practice for treating mental health disorders, like anxiety, bipolar disorder, schizophrenia and major depression.

== History ==
The Psychiatry Academy was officially started in 2003 by the Department of Psychiatry at Massachusetts General Hospital (MGH). This Department was founded in 1934 with support from the Rockefeller Foundation, has numerous staff who hold professor and teaching positions at Harvard Medical School, and has been ranked #1 in the country for numerous years by U.S. News & World Report.

In 2008, the Psychiatry Academy launched a 25-year partnership with Reed Medical Education (RME). RME now produces the continuing medical education programs offered by the Psychiatry Academy and handles tasks like marketing and logistics, while the Psychiatry Academy focuses on determining educational needs and content development.

The Psychiatry Academy's Webcast programs used to be called "PsychLink" and were also offered via satellite broadcasts, yet that changed slightly with the launch of the new agreement with RME. Now they are available only via Webcast, and are no longer called PsychLink.

In May 2008, the Psychiatry Academy held a live webcast entitled The Returning Veteran: PTSD and Traumatic Brain Injury. Panelists for this webcast included Colonel Elspeth Cameron Ritchie, Director of Proponency of Behavioral Health, U.S. Army Surgeon General's Office; and Terence M. Keane, PhD, Director, Behavioral Science Division, National Center for PTSD, and Professor and Vice-Chair, Department of Psychiatry, Boston University School of Medicine.

== Faculty and staff ==
Faculty at Psychiatry Academy activities and programs come from within Massachusetts General Hospital and other educational institutions like Yale University and Mount Sinai School of Medicine.

== Courses ==
- Psychiatry and Neurology
- Psychotherapy
- Psychopharmacology
- Mental health and primary care practices
