= Luis Bernardo Honwana =

Mozambican author and statesman (born 1942)

- Born: 1942 (age 83–84); Lourenço Marques, Mozambique
- Occupations: Author and statesman
- Notable work: We Killed Mangy Dog and Other Stories

Luís Bernardo Honwana (born 1942) is a Mozambican author and statesman.

== Biography ==
Luís Bernardo Honwana was born Luís Augusto Bernardo Manuel in Lourenço Marques (present-day Maputo), Mozambique. His parents, Raúl Bernardo Manuel (Honwana) and Naly Jeremias Nhaca, belonged to the Ronga people from Moamba, a town about 55 km north-west of Maputo.

In 1964, he became a militant with FRELIMO, a front that had the objective to liberate Mozambique from Portuguese colonial rule. Due to his political activities he was arrested by the colonial authorities and was incarcerated for three years, from 1964 to 1967. In 1970, he went to Portugal and did a law degree at the University of Lisbon. For some time, he worked as a journalist. In 1975, upon independence, he became Director of the Office of President Samora Machel. In 1982, he became the Secretary of State for Culture of Mozambique. In 1986, he was appointed Minister of Culture of Mozambique. In 1987, he was elected a member of the Executive Council of the United Nations Educational, Scientific and Cultural Organization (UNESCO).

He served on the Executive Board of UNESCO from 1987 to 1991 and was chairman of UNESCO's Intergovernmental Committee for the World Decade for Culture and Development. In 1995, he was appointed director of the newly opened UNESCO office in South Africa. Since he retired from the organization in 2002, he has been active in research in the arts, history, and ethno-linguistics.

In 1991, he founded Fundo Bibliográfico de Língua Portuguesa and later founded Organização Nacional dos Jornalistas de Moçambique (National Organization of Journalists of Mozambique), Associação Moçambicana de Fotografia (Mozambican Photography Association), and Associação dos Escritores Moçambicanos (Mozambican Writers Association). He is currently the executive director of Fundação para a Conservação da Biodiversidade (BIOFUND, Foundation for the Conservation of Biodiversity).

== Works ==
For decades, Honwana was the author of a single book, Nós Matámos o Cão-Tinhoso (1964), a classic of African literature and the most widely read and influential Lusophone African fiction ever published. It was translated into English by Dorothy Guedes as We Killed Mangy Dog and Other Stories (1969). He self-published Nós Matámos o Cão-Tinhoso when he was 22 years old, while a political prisoner of PIDE. He also published the tale "Hands of the Blacks".

We Killed Mangy Dog is a collection of short stories set in the (Portuguese) colonial era at the turn of the 1960s and is reflective of the harsh life black Mozambicans lived under the Salazar regime. It "denuncia e contesta a realidade brutal de Moçambique na época do colonialismo" (denounces and challenges the brutal reality of Mozambique in the era of colonialism). Honwana's stories were written for a greater purpose than entertainment and amusement. They "raise questions about social exploration, racial segregation, and class and education distinctions." Several of the stories are told from the point of view of children or alienated adolescents and most feature the rich mix of races, religions and ethnicities that would later preoccupy Mozambique's most internationally celebrated writer, Mia Couto.

In 2017, more than fifty years after he published his first book, Honwana published a second book, nonfiction, titled A Veha Casa de Madeira e Zinco (The Old House of Wood and Zinc), a collection of previously published essays and other commentary.

== Reputation ==
According to Patrick Chabal, "Honwana greatly influenced the post-colonial generation of younger prose writers and has rightly been regarded as stylistically accomplished." Honwana is considered "an iconic figura in the development of Mozambican literary prose style."
