= Julius Frank =

German professor and philosopher (1808–1841)

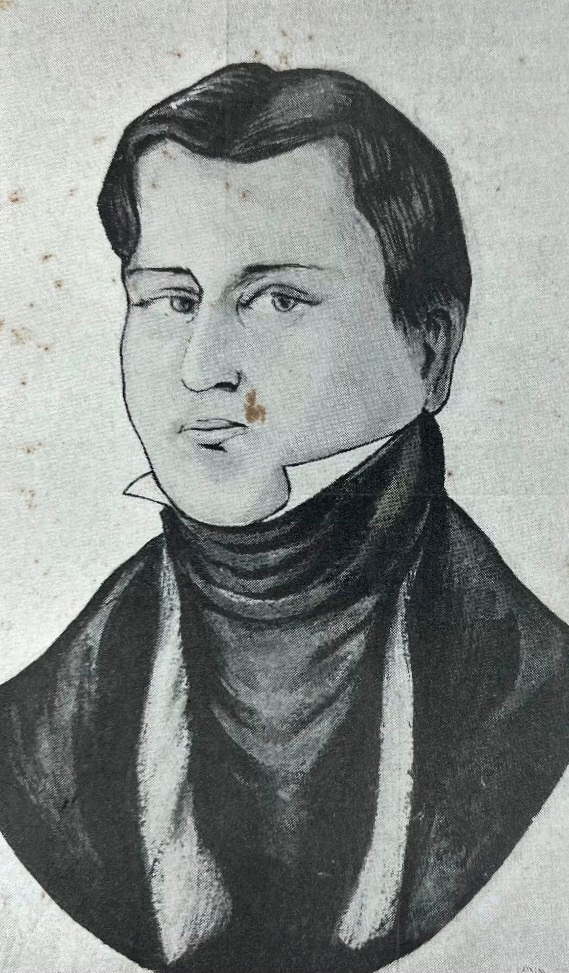
- Born: 8 December 1808; Gotha, Saxe-Gotha-Altenburg
- Died: 19 June 1841 (aged 32); São Paulo, São Paulo, Brazil
- Occupation: Professor

Johann Julius Gottfried Ludwig Frank (8 December 1808 – 19 June 1841), Julius Frank in short, was a professor of history, geography and philosophy from Gotha, Germany. He taught at the Largo de São Francisco's Law School in São Paulo (today's Faculty of Law of the University of São Paulo), Brazil. He was an advocator of a liberal philosophy and founded the Students League in Brazil (Burschenschaft).

Frank was a member of the secret association "Burschenschaft Paulista", also known as the Bucha, founded in 1831 and intended to help the disadvantaged through a network of students and former students from Largo de São Francisco's Law School.

Because Frank was a Protestant, he could not be buried in Catholic ground, which was a problem because São Paulo only had Catholic graveyards by the time of his death. São Francisco's students then buried him inside the Law School, and his grave is still there nowadays, although his bones were removed a couple of decades ago.

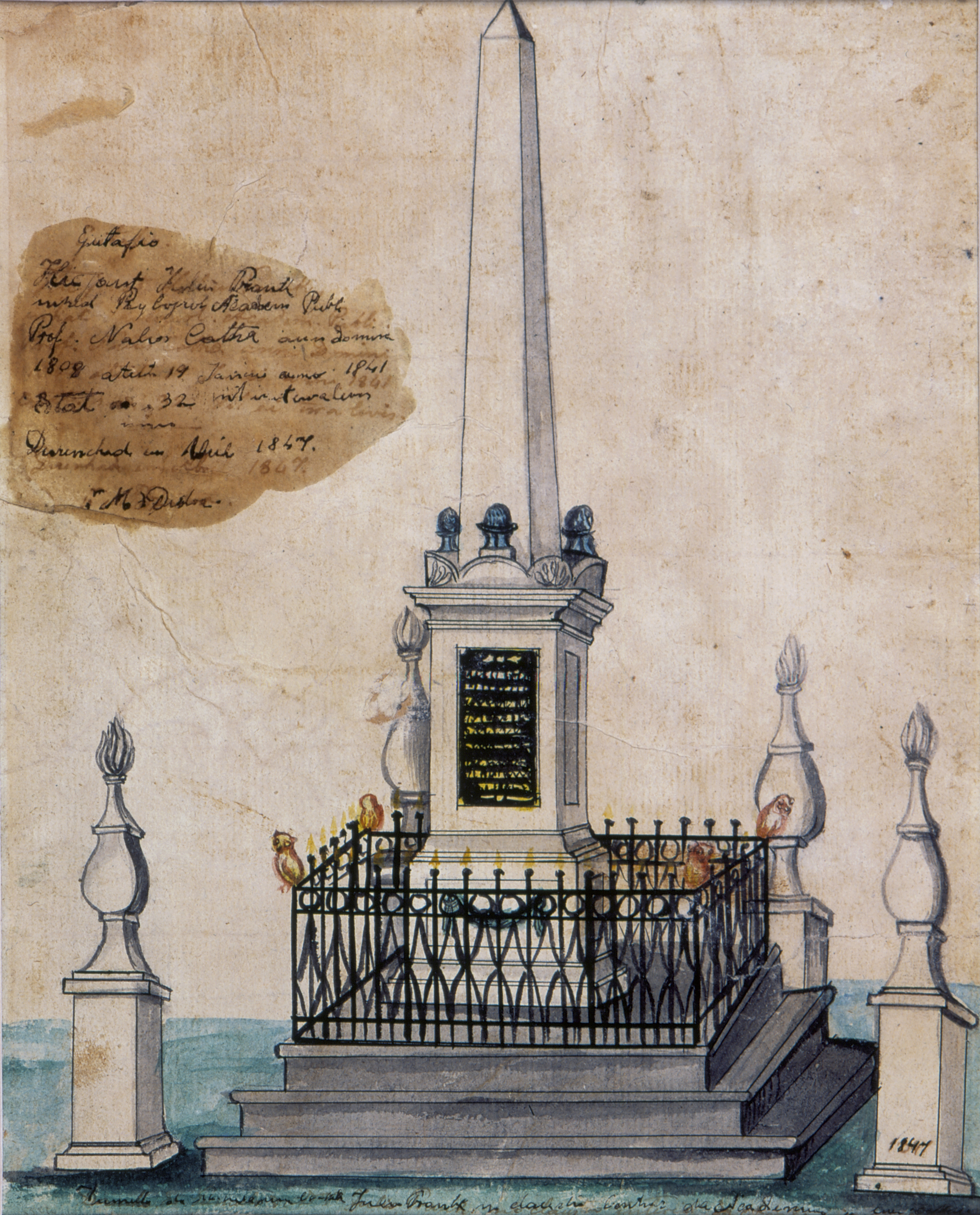
Julius Frank's tomb in 1847, watercolor by Miguelzinho Dutra

== Work ==
- Resumo de História Universal (1839)
