= Euryclides de Jesus Zerbini =

Brazilian physician and cardiac surgeon

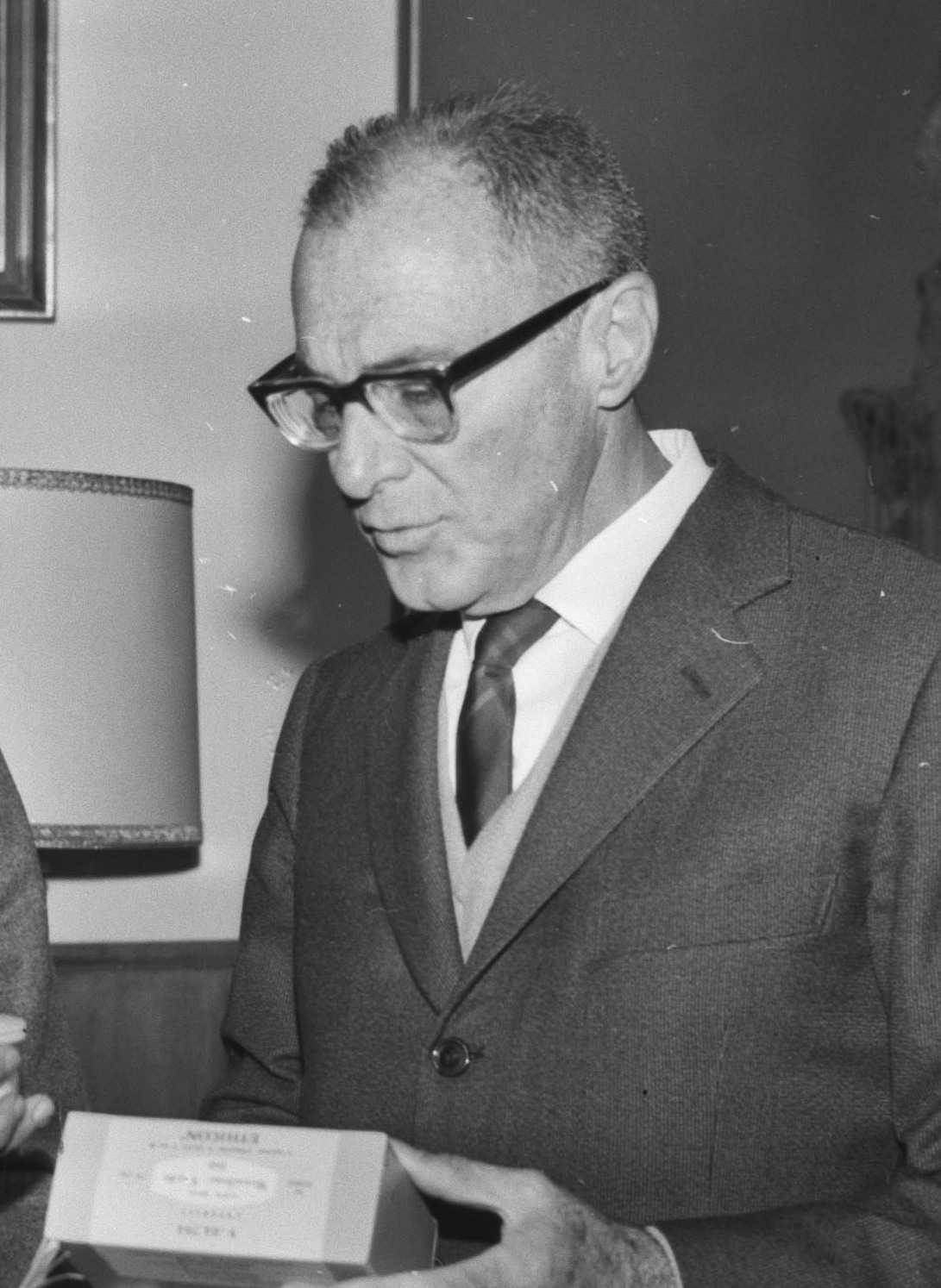
Dr. Euryclides Zerbini, in 1968.

Euryclides de Jesus Zerbini (10 May 1912 – 23 October 1993) was a Brazilian physician and cardiac surgeon. He is internationally known for performing the first heart transplantation in Latin America in 1968, and for creating the famous and respected clinical and research center Instituto do Coração da Universidade de São Paulo (Heart Institute of the University of São Paulo), in São Paulo, Brazil.
