= Heart Institute, University of São Paulo =

Coordinates: 23.557040°S 46.667729°W

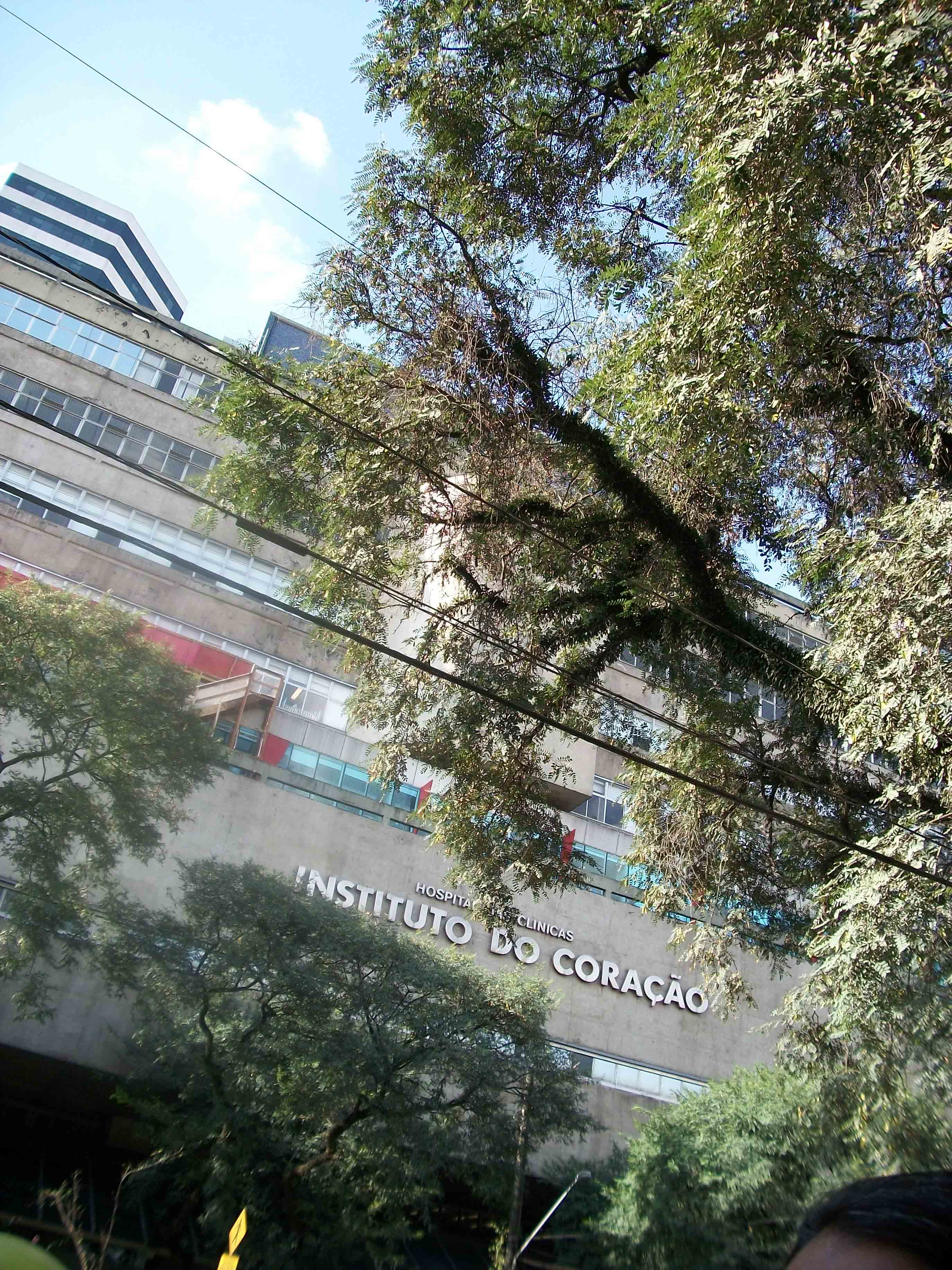
InCor

The Heart Institute, University of São Paulo (Portuguese: Instituto do Coração da Universidade de São Paulo, or InCor) is one of the clinical institutes of the central University's teaching hospital (Hospital das Clínicas da Universidade de São Paulo) and recognized as one of the world's academic and clinical excellence centers in cardiology, cardiovascular medicine and cardiovascular surgery.

The Heart Institute was founded in 1963 (63 years ago) by the noted cardiovascular surgeon and professor of the Faculty of Medicine of the University of São Paulo, Dr. Euryclides de Jesus Zerbini.
