= We Killed Mangy Dog and Other Stories =

1964 collection of stories by Luís Bernardo Honwana

We Killed Mangy Dog and Other Mozambique Stories (Nós Matámos o Cão-Tinhoso) is a 1964 collection of short stories by Mozambican writer Luís Bernardo Honwana. It is a classic of African literature, appearing on the Zimbabwe International Book Fair list "100 Best African Books of the Twentieth Century" of 2002.

The book consists of seven stories, including one with the same title as the book: "Nós Matámos o Cão-Tinhoso" [We Killed Mangy Dog], "Papa, Cobra, Eu" [Dad, Snake, and Me], "As Mãos dos Pretos" [The Hands of Blacks], "Inventário de Móveis e Jacentes" [Inventory of Furniture and Effects], "A Velhota" [The Old Woman], "Nhinguitimo," and "Dina" [Lunchtime].

== Publication history ==
The book was originally published in Portuguese in 1964 and translated into English in 1969. The writer, who is also a documentary filmmaker and photographer, wrote the stories when he was 22 years old, while a political prisoner of PIDE.

The famous Portuguese-Mozambican architect Pancho Guedes organized the publication of the Mozambique first edition, and commissioned the cover by Mozambican artist Bertina Lopes. The English translation was made not long after by Guedes' British wife, Dorothy Guedes. The cover and inside illustration of the English edition was made by Pedro Guedes, their teenage son.

It was first published in Africa and was quickly banned by the Portuguese authorities. It was a long time before the book was published in Portugal:

- Original edition: Nós Matámos o Cão Tinhoso (Lourenço Marques: Publicações Sociedade de Imprensa de Moçambique, 1964), 135p. Illustrations by Bertina Lopes (1926-2012).
- English edition: We Killed Mangy Dog and Other Mozambican Stories (Heinemann African Writers Series, No. 60), trans. by Dorothy Guedes. 117p. Illustrations by Pedro Guedes.
- Portuguese edition, with revisions. Nós Matámos o Cão Tinhoso: contos moçambicanos (Porto: Afrontamento, 1972), 147p.
- 2nd Mozambican edition: Nós Matámos o Cão Tinhoso (Lourenço Marques: Académica, 1975), 124p. (Colecção «Som e Sentido»; no.7)
- New edition, labelled 2nd ed., revised by the author: Nós Matámos o Cão Tinhoso (Maputo: INLD, 1978), 109p.
- Brazilian edition: Nós Matámos o Cão Tinhoso (São Paulo: Ática, 1980), 96p. (Coleção «Autores Africanos»; no.4)
- New edition, labelled 3rd ed.: Nós Matámos o Cão Tinhoso (Maputo: INLD, 1984), 109p.
- Another Portuguese edition: Nós Matámos o Cão Tinhoso (Porto: Afrontamento, 1988), 144 p.

== Reception ==
This book has been called "um marco da literatura moçambicana" (a landmark of Mozambican literature). The book "exercised a massive influence on the subsequent generation of Mozambican prose writers."

When it was published, "a obra foi alvo de polêmica, sendo criticada por parte daqueles que defendiam o colonialismo e simpatizavam com o regime do ditador português António de Oliveira Salazar, e aclamada por aqueles que, portadores de ideias nacionalistas, defendiam a liberdade e a autonomia do país" (the work was the subject of controversy, being criticized by those who defended colonialism and sympathized with the regime of Portuguese dictator António de Oliveira Salazar, and acclaimed by those who, with nationalist ideas, defended the country's freedom and autonomy). Indeed, it "provoked a storm of outrage among right-wing Portuguese settlers." Honwana was arrested not long after its publication by the colonial authorities. But others "praised him for having captured demotic Mozambican patterns of speech." The original texts of this early debate about the book are available. Abudo Machude published a book in Portuguese about the critical reception of Honwana's book.

Nós Matámos o Cão Tinhoso has been translated into English, French, German and Russian, and has been produced in the theatre.

Nós Matámos o Cão Tinhoso won first place in the international literary contest of The Classic magazine in South Africa in 1965.

== Collection's Themes and symbols ==
The Mozambican world is at the center of analysis in each of his narratives. Several of the stories are told from the point of view of children. The innocent and naïve characters are used to expose "the inherent racism in the Portuguese colonial government." Honwana's stories were written for a greater purpose than entertainment and amusement. They "raise questions about social exploration, racial segregation, and class and education distinctions." Each character in every story represents a different social position (white Portuguese man, the assimilated black, the indigenous black, and mixed race). In Lusophone Studies 2, a volume in a series published by University of Bristol, Mark Sabine analyzes the aspects of gender, race, and violence found in Honwana's short stories. According to Sabine, "Focusing almost exclusively on male protagonists and their humiliation and disenfranchisement, Honwana depicts colonial rule as the literal emasculation of Africa" (24). In the stories, the institutional denial of equal human rights to colonized Mozambicans is apparent and linked to the betrayal of an implicit promise based on shared masculine identity: "Men classified as assimilados or civilizados, who have assumed a Portuguese cultural identity on the promise of equal civil rights, might expect equal access to the patriarchal dividend" (29).

== Short Story "Mangy Dog" Plot, Themes, and Symbols ==
This last and longest story in the volume is narrated by Ginho, who is marginalized and alienated by his peers in school and out of school. The story centers around Mangy-Dog (Cão-Tinhoso), a stray that is diseased, helpless, and dying. The narrator feels compassion and sympathy for the dog for these reasons but also because the dog is an outcast among other dogs and because a girl, Isauro, loves the dog. One day, the narrator and the group of boys from his class are asked to kill the dog by the veterinarian. He presents the act as a kind of hunting game and appeals to them as a group of friends. Ginho is the only one who says that he doesn't want to kill the dog, but the other boys, in part due to their own reluctance, force him to shoot at the dog first. Although Ginho misses the dog, his friends go on to shoot and kill the dog. As one critic said, "La simplicité du style - adapté au point de vue d'un enfant - se combine à la richesse de différents niveaux d'interprétation" (the simplicity of the style - adapted to a child's point of view - combines with the richness of different levels of interpretation).

=== Race and Gender in Mangy Dog ===
The boys in the narrative all have different racial backgrounds: Ginho is a young, black, assimilado boy; Quim is the white leader of the gang; Faruk is an Arab; Gulamo is Indian; and Xangai is Chinese. Ginho is the victim of both racial and gendered discrimination when in the novel Quim and Gulamo call him "maricas" (sissy) and "Preto de merda" (you black shit) for not being able to kill Mangy Dog. In addition to being insulted with a racial epithet, he is emasculated by the other boys.

As Sabine notes, "Honwana's women are most often not protagonists capable of acting and learning, but a social resource under the control of men" (42). There are three women in the story of Mangy Dog: Ginho's mother, his teacher, and his classmate Isaura. Ginho's mother attempts to discipline him but her protests are futile as he leaves the house with his father's rifle. Isaura attempts to stop the killing, but is yelled at by the boys' leader Quim and told to leave. Her values of compassion and pacifism are considered "feminine" by the boys and the colonial patriarchy they serve (Sabine 43).

=== Symbolism of Mangy Dog ===
According to Pires Laranjeira, citing an interpretation (by Inocência Mata), Mangy Dog represents a decadent colonial system that is in need of being destroyed in order to make way for a new pure society, free of discrimination and racism. Mata points out that Mangy Dog is shot to death with firearms, the same way that Mozambique gained its independence through the use of military force. This is why the Mangy Dog is represented as having blue eyes. But, according to Niyi Afolabi, the mangy dog's blue eyes can simultaneously point to the black colonial subject and the European colonizer. Cláudia Pazos Alonso adds to that interpretation by stating that the blue eyes of the dog could symbolize a black assimilado.

=== Masculinity in Mangy Dog ===
The short story has been seen as an early critique of toxic masculinity. The murder of Mangy Dog is a process of initiation into manhood in which Ginho and the others, who prize "physical prowess, power, and aggression," go through an initiation rite, or a kind of apprenticeship, in order to find affective solidarity. The critic Sabine describes the act of killing Mangy Dog as a "painful initiation into a grown-up social order" (24). As such, "the killing constitutes a grotesque substitute for the elaborate rites marking a boy's passage to manhood in indigenous cultures" (34). Because "Ginho lacked a role model who stresses the ideals of courage, leadership, compassion, and the dedication of physical strength," as a result, "The aggressive effacement of the figure of the black patriarch not only necessitates the valorization of violence as 'manly', but also marginalizes the values which Honwana ascribes to an indigenous paradigm of masculinity: bravery, endurance, dignity and deference to elders" (25).
