= Anatol Rosenfeld =

Anatol Herbert Rosenfeld (28 August 1910 – 11 December 1973) was a Brazilian philosopher, literary and art critic, journalist, and theatre theorist. He is best known for his works on Bertolt Brecht, epic theatre, cinema, and Afro-Brazilian culture.

== Biography ==
Born in Przemyśl, a Polish city under Austro-Hungarian rule, Rosenfeld moved to Germany with his family in 1912. He attended the Humboldt University of Berlin, where he studied philosophy under Nicolai Hartmann and Eduard Spranger, aesthetics under Max Dessoir, and literary theory under Julius Petersen, as well as history and German literature. In 1936, fleeing nazism, he arrived in Brazil, where he initially worked as a farmer and a peddler, later becoming a prolific essayist, with a focus on German literature.

Besides giving private courses on philosophy and literature, Rosenfeld also taught at the University of São Paulo. Many of his lectures were transcribed and posthumously published as books. He was called a ''civilizing hero'' by Antonio Candido.

== Works ==
- Doze Estudos (1959)
- O Teatro Épico (1965)
- A Personagem de Ficção (1968)
- Teatro Alemão (1968)
- Texto/Contexto (1969)
- Estrutura e Problema das Obras Literárias (1976)
- Mistificações Literárias: ''Os Protocolos dos Sábios de Sião'' (1976)
- Teatro Moderno (1977)
- O Mito e o Herói no Moderno Teatro Brasileiro (1982)
- O Pensamento Psicológico (1984)
- História da Literatura e do Teatro Alemães (1993)
- Letras Germânicas (1993)
- Negro, Macumba e Futebol (1993)

== See also ==
- Anatol Rosenfeld on Enciclopédia Itaú Cultural
