= Euripedes Constantino Miguel =

Brazilian psychiatrist (born 1959)

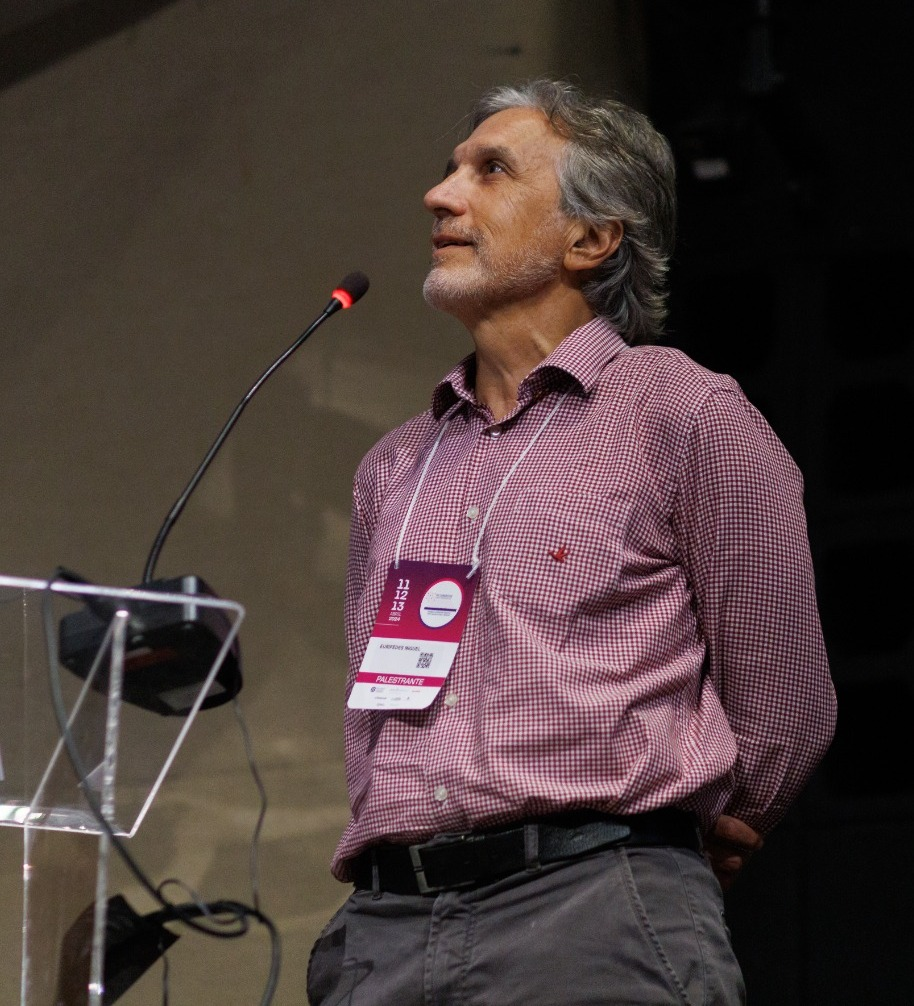
Euripedes Constantino Miguel

Euripedes Constantino Miguel Filho (born June 14, 1959) is a Brazilian psychiatrist and professor who is full professor of the Department of Psychiatry at FMUSP and associate adjunct professor at the Yale University School of Medicine. Between 2009 and 2019, he was an associate professor in the Department of Psychiatry at Duke University and, from 2009 to 2014, a research consultant at Massachusetts General Hospital, Harvard Medical School.

As a researcher, he has published over 500 articles. These works have been cited more than 24,000 times, resulting in an h-index of 84. He has edited 24 books. He is a researcher at the São Paulo Research Foundation and a level 1A research productivity fellow at the National Council for Scientific and Technological Development. He coordinates the National Institute of Developmental Psychiatry and the National Center for Research and Innovation in Mental Health.

== Education ==
After completing his pre-university education at Colégio São Luís, Miguel entered the School of Medicine at the University of São Paulo, in 1977. In 1979, he was president of the Associação Atlética Acadêmica Oswaldo Cruz.

After completing his undergraduate degree, he entered the Medical Residency in General Psychiatry at the Psychiatry Institute of the Hospital das Clínicas, FMUSP. With his thesis concerning psychopathological changes in patients diagnosed with systemic lupus erythematosus, Dr. Miguel earned his doctorate under the supervision of Valentim Gentil Filho in 1992.

Miguel completed a post-doctoral fellowship at Massachusetts General Hospital, Harvard Medical School, with Michael Jenike as his principal supervisor.

== Career ==
In 1994, he was one of the founders of the Projeto de Transtornos do Espectro Obsessivo-Compulsivo - PROTOC (Obsessive-Compulsive Spectrum Disorders Program). With the members of this group, he coordinated three thematic projects funded by the São Paulo Research Foundation (Fapesp) and was the principal investigator of a project funded by the National Institutes of Health (NIH) focused on research into the neurobiological signature of OCD. Since 2023, he has been the principal investigator of a project at the National Institute of Mental Health (NIMH) focused on the genetic signature of OCD in a diverse sample of 5,000 patients in Latin America. Since 2004, he has coordinated the Brazilian Research Consortium on Obsessive-Compulsive Spectrum Disorders (C-TOC).

Since 1992, Miguel has been researching various topics related to Obsessive-Compulsive Disorder (OCD), including comorbidities, enhancement of medications used in treatment, clinical characterization, biological markers, and neural circuit. Recently, he has become responsible for the Child and Adolescent Psychiatry course in the Department of Psychiatry at the School of Medicine, USP, with the goal of advancing this field in the country.

Miguel coordinates the National Institute of Developmental Psychiatry. Established in 2008, the INPD was created with the goal of shifting the paradigm in psychiatric research from a focus on treating individuals who are already ill to a more proactive approach.

Miguel coordinates the National Center for Research and Innovation in Mental Health) launched in 2023 to preserve and continue the legacy of INPD and with the purpose of advancing and disseminating knowledge about mental health.

In 2009, Miguel took on the roles of Full Professor and Head of the Department of Psychiatry at the School of Medicine, University of São Paulo. In 2024, he was elected for the fifth time to hold this leadership position until 2026.

== Awards ==
In 2012, Miguel received the 54th Jabuti Prize for the book “Clínica Psiquiátrica - A Visão do Departamento e do Instituto de Psiquiatria do HCFMUSP".

In 2018, the "Primeiros Laços" (First-ties) project, one of the early childhood intervention studies from INPD/CISM, won the Abril/DASA Social Medicine Award.

== Interviews ==
In 2024, Miguel was interviewed by the American magazine "Brain Medicine", Genomic Press platform. Entitled "Risk factors for obsessive-compulsive and other mental health disorders and their treatment and public policy implications", the article addresses Miguel's passion for science and research, his academic and professional trajectory, leadership role in this field, as well as aspects of his personal and family life.

== Selected publications ==
=== Books ===
- MIGUEL, E.C.. Psiquiatria da infância e adolescência. 2. ed. Barueri: Manole, 2026.
- Miguel EC, Rauch S, Leckman J.Neuropsychiatry of Basal Ganglia. Psychiatric Clinics of North America. Philadelphia: WB Saunders;20 (4); 1997.
- Lafer B, AlmeidaOP, Fraguas JR, R, Miguel EC. Depressão no ciclo da vida. PortoAlegre: Artes Médicas Sul; 2000.
- Oliveira IR, Rosario MC, Miguel EC. Princípios e Prática em Transtorno Obsessivo- Compulsivo. Rio de Janeiro : Guanabara Koogan, 2007
- Miguel EC, Gentil Filho V, Gattaz W F. Clinica Psiquiátrica (2 volumes). Barueri, SP : Manole, 2011.
- Hounie AG, Miguel EC. Tiques, cacoetes, Sindrome de Tourette. Um Manual para Pacientes, seus familiares, educadores e profissionais de saúde (2ª edição)., Porto Alegre: Artmed, 2012.
- Torres AR, Shavitt RG, Miguel EC. Medos, dúvidas e manias: orientações para pessoas com transtorno obsessivo-compulsivo e seus familiares. Porto Alegre : Artmed, 2013.

=== Articles ===
- MIGUEL, E.C.. Transtorno obsessivo-compulsivo. In: Polanczyk GV et al. (Coords.). (Org.). Psiquiatria da infância e adolescência. 2ed.Barueri: Manole, 2026, v. , p. 243-251.
- MIGUEL, E.C.. Transtornos de tique. In: Polanczyk GV et al. (Coords.). (Org.). Psiquiatria da infância e adolescência. 2ed.Barueri: Manole, 2025, v. , p. 202-211.
- Miguel EC, Pereira RM, Pereira CA, Baer L, et al. Psychiatric manifestations of systemic lupus erythematosus: clinical features, symptoms, and signs of central nervous system activity in 43 patients. Medicine (Baltimore). 1994 Jul;73(4):224-32
- Rauch SL, Savage CR, Alpert NM, Miguel EC, Baer L, Breiter HC, Fischman AJ, Manzo PA, Moretti C, Jenike MA. A positron emission tomographic study of simple phobic symptom provocation.Arch Gen Psychiatry. 1995 Jan;52(1):20-8
- Miguel EC, Baer L, Coffey BJ, et al. Phenomenological differences appearing with repetitive behaviours in obsessive-compulsive disorder and Gilles de la Tourette's syndrome. Br J Psychiatry. 1997 Feb;170:140-5
- Miguel EC, do Rosário-Campos MC, Prado HS, et al. Sensory phenomena in obsessive-compulsive disorder and Tourette's disorder.J Clin Psychiatry. 2000 Feb;61(2):150-6; quiz 157.
- Mercadante MT, Busatto GF, Lombroso PJ, Prado L, Rosário-Campos MC, do Valle R, Marques-Dias MJ, Kiss MH, Leckman JF, Miguel EC. The psychiatric symptoms of rheumatic fever. Am J Psychiatry. 2000 Dec;157(12):2036-8.
- Rosario-Campos MC, Leckman JF, Mercadante MT, Shavitt RG, Prado HS, Sada P, Zamignani D, Miguel EC. Adults with early-onset obsessive-compulsive disorder. Am J Psychiatry. 2001 Nov;158(11):1899-903
- Maia AF, Pinto AS, Barbosa ER, Menezes PR, Miguel EC. Obsessive-compulsive symptoms, obsessive-compulsive disorder, and related disorders in Parkinson's disease.J Neuropsychiatry Clin Neurosci. 2003; 15(3):371-4.
- Miguel EC, Shavitt RG, Ferrão YA, et al. How to treat OCD in patients with Tourette syndrome J Psychosom Res. 2003 Jul;55(1):49-57
- Miguel EC, Leckman JF, Rauch S, et al. Obsessive-compulsive disorder phenotypes: implications for genetic studies.Mol Psychiatry. 2005 Mar;10(3):258-75.
- do Rosario-Campos MC, Leckman JF, Curi M, Quatrano S, Katsovitch L, Miguel EC, Pauls DL. A family study of early-onset obsessive-compulsive disorder.Am J Med Genet B Neuropsychiatr Genet. 2005
- Ferrão YA, Shavitt RG, Bedin NR, de Mathis ME, Carlos Lopes A, Fontenelle LF, Torres AR, Miguel EC. Clinical features associated to refractory obsessive-compulsive disorder. J Affect Disord. 2006 Aug;94(1-3):199-209
- Rosario-Campos MC, Miguel EC, Quatrano S, et al. The Dimensional Yale-Brown Obsessive-Compulsive Scale (DY-BOCS): an instrument for assessing obsessive-compulsive symptom dimensions. Mol Psychiatry. 2006 May;11(5):495-504
- Hounie AG, Pauls DL, do Rosario-Campos MC, Mercadante MT, Diniz JB, De Mathis MA, De Mathis ME, Chacon P, Shavitt RG, Curi M, Guilherme L, Miguel EC. Obsessive-compulsive spectrum disorders and rheumatic fever: a family study. Biol Psychiatry. 2007 Feb 1;61(3):266-72.
- Miguel EC, Ferrão YA, Rosário MC, Mathis MA, Torres AR, Fontenelle LF, Hounie AG, Shavitt RG, Cordioli AV, Gonzalez CH, Petribú K, Diniz JB, Malavazzi DM, Torresan RC, Raffin AL, Meyer E, Braga DT, Borcato S, Valério C, Gropo LN, Prado Hda S, Perin EA, Santos SI, Copque H, Borges MC, Lopes AP, Silva ED; Brazilian Research Consortium on Obsessive-Compulsive Spectrum Disorders. The Brazilian Research Consortium on Obsessive-Compulsive Spectrum Disorders: recruitment, assessment instruments, methods for the development of multicenter collaborative studies and preliminary results. Rev Bras Psiquiatr. 2008 Sep;30(3):185-96.
- Torres AR, Ramos-Cerqueira AT, Ferrão YA, Fontenelle LF, do Rosário MC, Miguel EC. Suicidality in obsessive-compulsive disorder: prevalence and relation to symptom dimensions and comorbid conditions. J Clin Psychiatry. 2011 Jan;72(1):17-26; quiz 119-20
- Diniz JB, Shavitt RG, Fossaluza V, Koran L, Pereira CA, Miguel EC. A double-blind, randomized, controlled trial of fluoxetine plus quetiapine or clomipramine versus fluoxetine plus placebo for obsessive-compulsive disorder. J Clin Psychopharmacol. 2011 Dec;31(6):763-8
- de Mathis MA, Diniz JB, Hounie AG, Shavitt RG, Fossaluza V, Ferrão Y, Leckman JF, de Bragança Pereira C, do Rosario MC, Miguel EC. Trajectory in obsessive-compulsive disorder comorbidities. Eur Neuropsychopharmacol. 2013 Jul;23(7):594-601
- Hoexter MQ, Dougherty DD, Shavitt RG, D'Alcante CC, Duran FL, Lopes AC, Diniz JB, Batistuzzo MC, Evans KC, Bressan RA, Busatto GF, Miguel EC. Differential prefrontal gray matter correlates of treatment response to fluoxetine or cognitive-behavioral therapy in obsessive-compulsive disorder.Eur Neuropsychopharmacol. 2013 Jul;23(7):569-80
- Gentil AF, Lopes AC, Dougherty DD, Rück C, Mataix-Cols D, Lukacs TL, Canteras MM, Eskandar EN, Larsson KJ, Hoexter MQ, Batistuzzo MC, Greenberg BD, Miguel EC. Hoarding symptoms and prediction of poor response to limbic system surgery for treatment-refractory obsessive-compulsive disorder. J Neurosurg. 2014 Jul;121(1):123-30. doi: 10.3171/2014.2.JNS131423. Epub 2014 Apr 4.
