= Roger Bastide =

Roger Bastide (1 April 1898, Nîmes – 10 April 1974, Maisons-Laffitte) was a French sociologist and anthropologist, specialist in sociology and Brazilian literature. Bastide is known for his contributions to the study of Afro-Brazilian and Afro-Caribbean religions.

He was raised as a Protestant and studied philosophy in France, developing at the same time an interest for sociological issues. His first sociological field research, in 1930–31, was about immigrants from Armenia to Valence, France. As scholars later noticed, already in his first works about the Armenians he was interested in how the memory of a different culture survives when a group of people moves to a faraway land, a theme that will become crucial in his studies of African populations in Brazil.

In 1938, the University of São Paulo asked him to succeed Claude Lévi-Strauss in its chair of Sociology. He remained in Brazil until 1957, and in 1958 moved back to France, where he became a professor of Sociology of religion at the Sorbonne University.

In 1958, shortly before starting his course at the Sorbonne, Bastide had made his first research trip to Africa, exploring the traditional religions of Dahomey and Nigeria. That same years, he published "Le Candomblé de Bahia". Bastide devoted the last part of his career to social psychology. In 1959, he created in Paris the Center for Social Psychiatry and in 1960 he published "The African Religions of Brazil: Toward a Sociology of the Interpenetration of Civilizations", a paper about Afro-Brazilian religions such as Catimbo, Xango, Candomblé, Macumba, Umbanda, and Batuques. After the death of Georges Gurvitch in 1965, he also became the director of the Paris Center for the Sociology of Knowledge. He retired from his teaching position at the Sorbonne in 1968. In 1973, one year before his death, he visited Brazil for the last time.

Bastide came to an “identification” with Candomblé practitioners, both religiously and emotionally, famously claiming “Africanus sum,” “I am an African.” This was criticized by a later generation of scholars as depriving him of the necessary objectivity.

On the other hand, with all his sympathy for Candomblé, Bastide ended up proposing “an historicist model in which candomblé is almost inevitably converted into umbanda or disaggregated into macumba.” Indeed, he regarded as a “privilege” to have been able to witness in Brazil the birth of Umbanda as a new religion.

An unintended effect of Bastide's work on, and sympathy for, Candomblé is that his books were read by practitioners of Candomblé themselves, contributing to the “codification” if not, as some scholars argue, to a new “invention of candomblé” in the 20th century.

An important, if controversial, sociological contribution of Bastide is his description of syncretism. At the core of his interpretation of syncretism is the “principle of compartmentalization” (principe de coupure), which “allows for the alternation or cohabitation, in a single individual or within a single group, of logics or categories that are supposedly otherwise incompatible and irreducible.” For instance, one can be both a Catholic and a practitioner of Candomblé: the two “compartments” live together, without merging, in the same individual, who does not see the coexistence as problematic. Only if he or she reflects about the contradictions, the individual moves to a “formal acculturation,” a second level of syncretism were the two previously separated religious world-views uneasily merge.

The character Agliè in Umberto Eco's Foucault's Pendulum bears resemblance to Roger Bastide.

== Publications ==
- "Le Candomblé de Bahia" (1958)
- "The African Religions of Brazil: Toward a Sociology of the Interpenetration of Civilizations" (1960)
- "African Civilizations in the New World", translated in 1971
