= University of São Paulo =

Public state university in Brazil

- Universidade de São Paulo
- Coat of arms of the University of São Paulo
- Other name: USP
- Motto: Scientia Vinces
- Motto in English: "Through knowledge you will conquer"
- Type: Public university
- Established: 25 January 1934; 92 years ago (Note: Since 11 August 1827 as a Law Academy.)
- Budget: R$ 9.15 billion
- Rector: Aluísio Segurado
- Academic staff: 5,306
- Administrative staff: 12,607
- Students: 97,325
- Undergraduates: 58,752
- Postgraduates: 29,487
- Location: São Paulo, Brazil; 23°33′35″S 46°43′45″W
- Campus: Bauru, Lorena, Piracicaba, Pirassununga, Ribeirão Preto, Santos, São Carlos, São Paulo, São Sebastião
- Colors: Primary blue, secondary blue and yellow
- Website: usp.br

The University of São Paulo (Portuguese: Universidade de São Paulo, USP) is a public research university in the Brazilian state of São Paulo, and the largest public university in Brazil.

The university was founded on 25 January 1934, regrouping already existing schools in the state of São Paulo, such as the Law School, the Polytechnic School, and the College of Agriculture. The university's foundation in that year was marked by the creation of the Faculty of Philosophy, Sciences and Literature, and subsequently new departments. Currently, the university is involved in teaching, research, and university extension in all areas of knowledge, offering a broad range of courses. It has eleven campuses, four of them in the city of São Paulo. The remaining campuses are in the cities of Bauru, Lorena, Piracicaba, Pirassununga, Ribeirão Preto and two in São Carlos.

University of São Paulo alumni and faculty include past or present 13 Brazilian presidents, members of the National Congress, and founders and executives of notable Brazilian companies. Regarding research, USP is among Brazil's largest research institutions, producing more than 25% of the scientific papers published by Brazilian researchers in high-quality conferences and journals.

== History ==
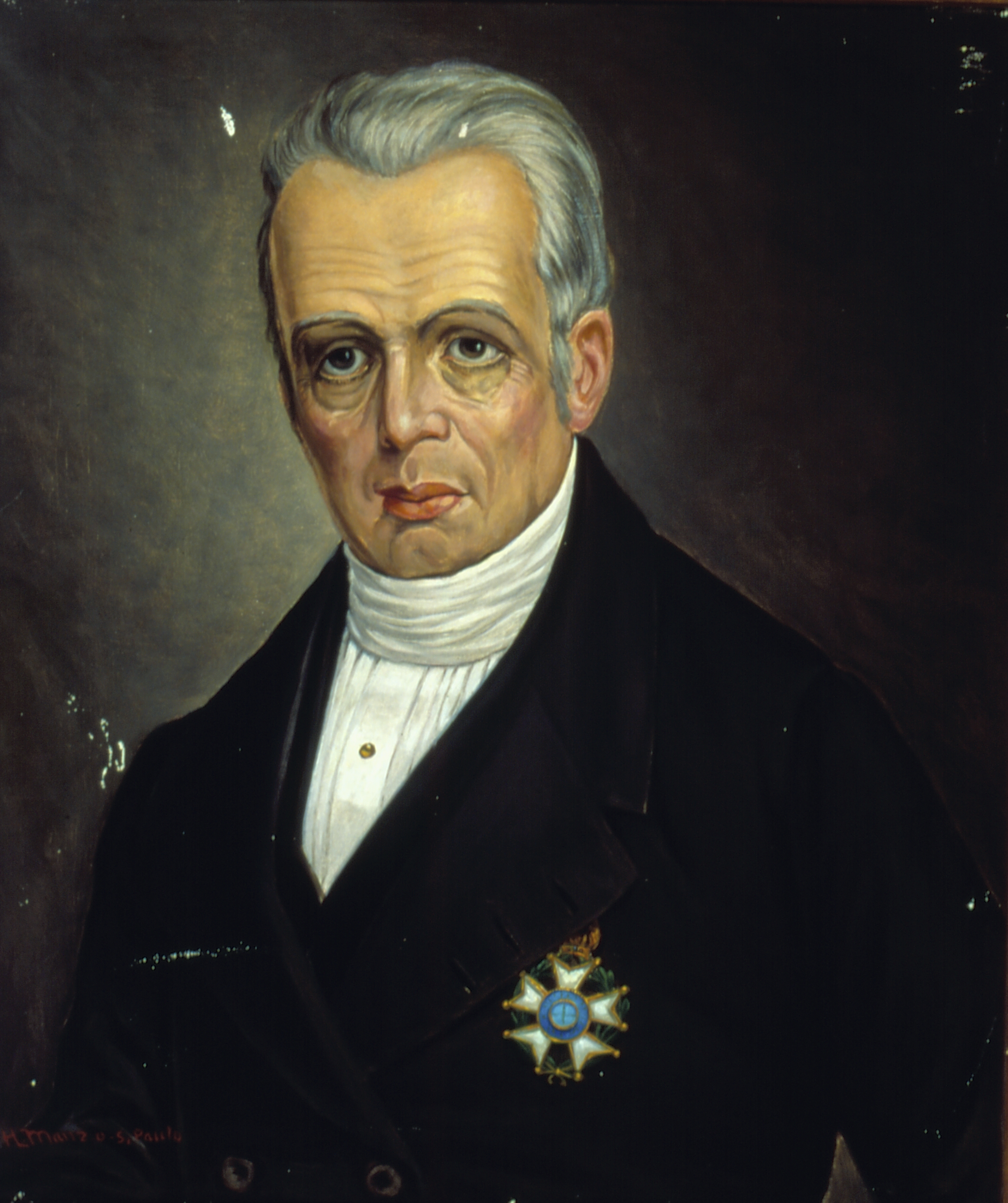
The Viscount of São Leopoldo, precursor of the São Paulo Law School, the oldest body of the University of São Paulo, in 1827

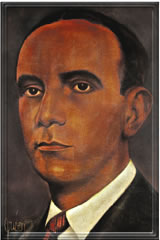
Armando de Sales Oliveira, intervenor of São Paulo and of the University of São Paulo, in 1934

After its defeat in the Constitutionalist Revolution, São Paulo needed institutional improvements. Therefore, in 1933, a group of businessmen founded the Free School of Sociology and Politics (ELSP) (the current Foundation of the School of Sociology and Politics in São Paulo). In 1934, the intervenor of São Paulo (which corresponded to the governor), Armando de Sales Oliveira, founded the University of São Paulo (USP).

That was one of the efforts to provide Brazil with modern administrative, educational, and military institutions in a period known as "the search for alternatives." One of the main initiatives included the founding, that same year, of the University of São Paulo. Its nucleus was the School of Philosophy, Sciences, and Languages, with professors from France, Italy, Spain, Germany, and other European countries. The ELSP (Escola Livre de Sociologia e Política) assumed the goal of administrative elites to form a new model in which they noted an increasing role of the state. At the same time, USP (Universidade de São Paulo) focused on training teachers for secondary schools, experts in sciences, engineers, lawyers, physicians, and professors. The ELSP followed a sociological American model, while USP used the French academic world as its primary source of inspiration.

Foreign professors such as Claude Lévi-Strauss (France), Fernand Braudel (France), Roger Bastide (France), Robert H. Aubreton (France), Heinrich Rheinboldt (Germany), Paul Arbousse Bastide (France), Jean Magüé (France), Martial Gueroult (France), Emilio Willems (Germany), Donald Pierson (US), Gleb Vassielievich Wataghin (Russia), Pierre Monbeig (France), Giacomo Albanese (Italy), Luigi Fantappiè (Italy), Vilém Flusser (Czech Republic), Giuseppe Ungaretti (Italy) and Herbert Baldus (Germany), broadcast in various institutions new standards for teaching and research, creating new generations of scientists in Brazil.

Since its foundation USP received professors and researchers from all over the world, such as David Bohm (US), Giuseppe Occhialini (Italy), François Châtelet (France), Anatol Rosenfeld (Germany), Helmi Nasr (Egypt), Gérard Lebrun (France), Fritz Köberle (Austria), Alexander Grothendieck (France), and Heinz Dieter Heidemann (Germany).

=== Origins ===
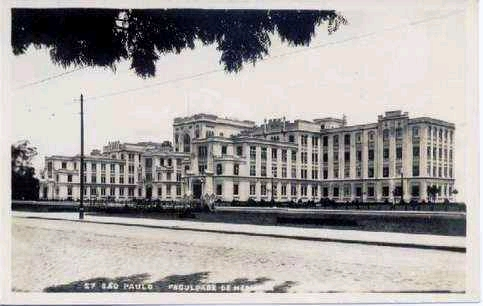
The Faculty of Medicine in the early twentieth century.

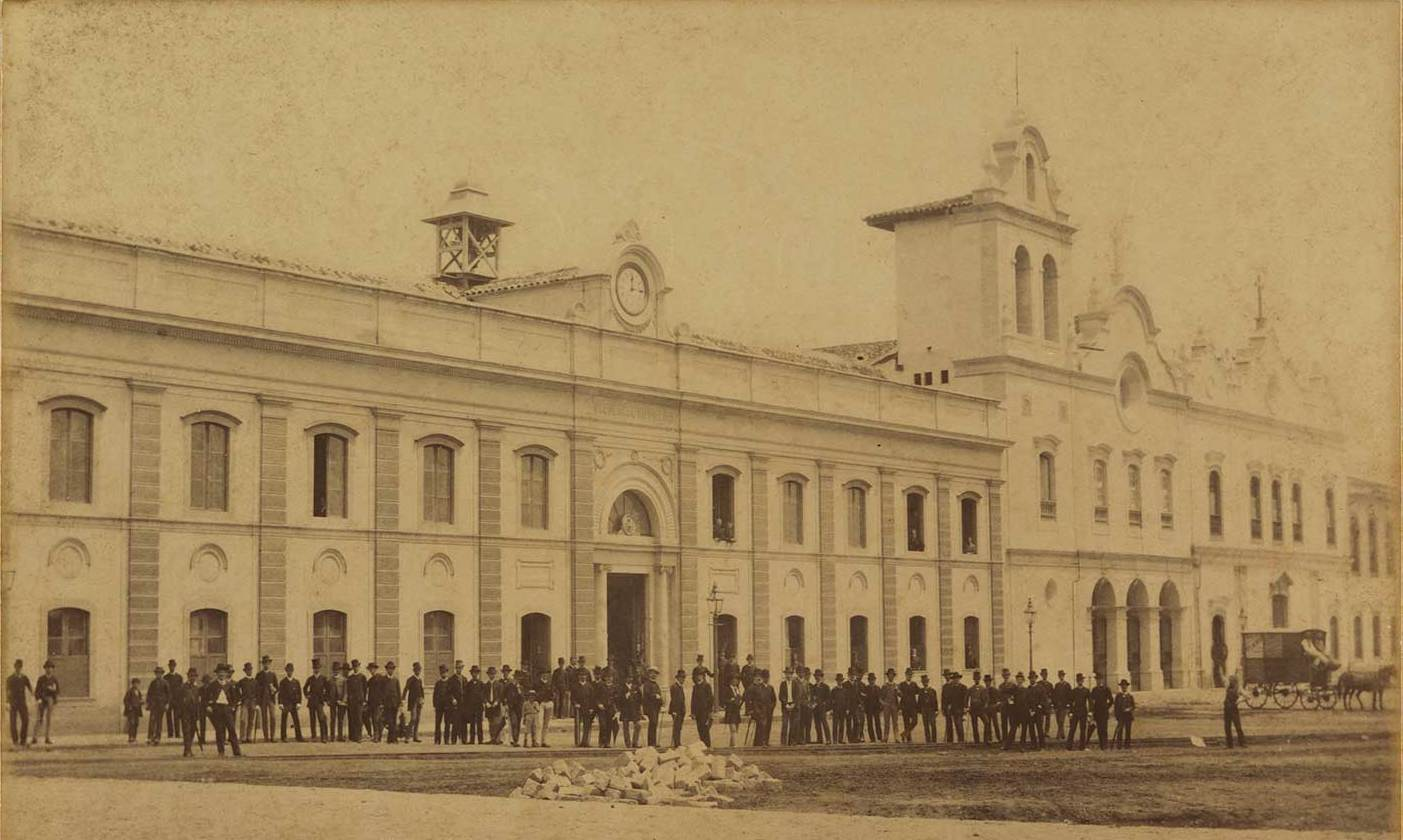
The Law School in 1880 during Pedro II's reign

The University of São Paulo is the result of a combination of the newly founded School of Philosophy, Sciences and Languages (Faculdade de Filosofia, Ciências e Letras, FFCL, currently the Faculty of Philosophy, Languages and Human Sciences – Faculdade de Filosofia, Letras e Ciências Humanas, FFLCH) with the existing Polytechnic School of Engineering (founded in 1893), the Luiz de Queiroz College of Agriculture (Escola Superior de Agricultura Luiz de Queiroz) (founded in 1901), the Medical School (founded in 1912), the traditional Law School (founded in 1827), the old School of Pharmacy and Dentistry (founded in 1898), the Institute of Astronomy, Geophysics and Atmospheric Sciences (founded in 1886), and the School of Veterinary Medicine (founded in 1919).

The FFCL emerged as the integrating element of the university, bringing together courses in various areas of knowledge. Also, in 1934, the School of Physical Education (sports science) of the State of São Paulo was created, the first civil school of physical education in Brazil, which would later be part of the university. In 1944, the Medical School opened its public hospital (Hospital das Clínicas da Universidade de São Paulo). The School of Engineering of Sao Carlos (EESC) emerged in the same year. In subsequent years, several other research units were also created, such as a second Medical School located in the city of Ribeirão Preto (São Paulo's inland) in 1952.

In the 1960s, the university gradually transferred the headquarters of some of its units to the City University Armando de Salles Oliveira, in São Paulo. In 1963, the Heart Institute of the University of São Paulo was founded. After that, new institutes and schools were created, for instance, the School of Journalism, Communications and Arts (ECA) in 1966. Over the years, some of the university's old departments were transformed into autonomous faculties or institutes, such as the Institute of Biomedical Sciences (ICB), the Institute of Geosciences (IGc), and the Institute of Biosciences (IB) in 1969.

=== Military dictatorship ===
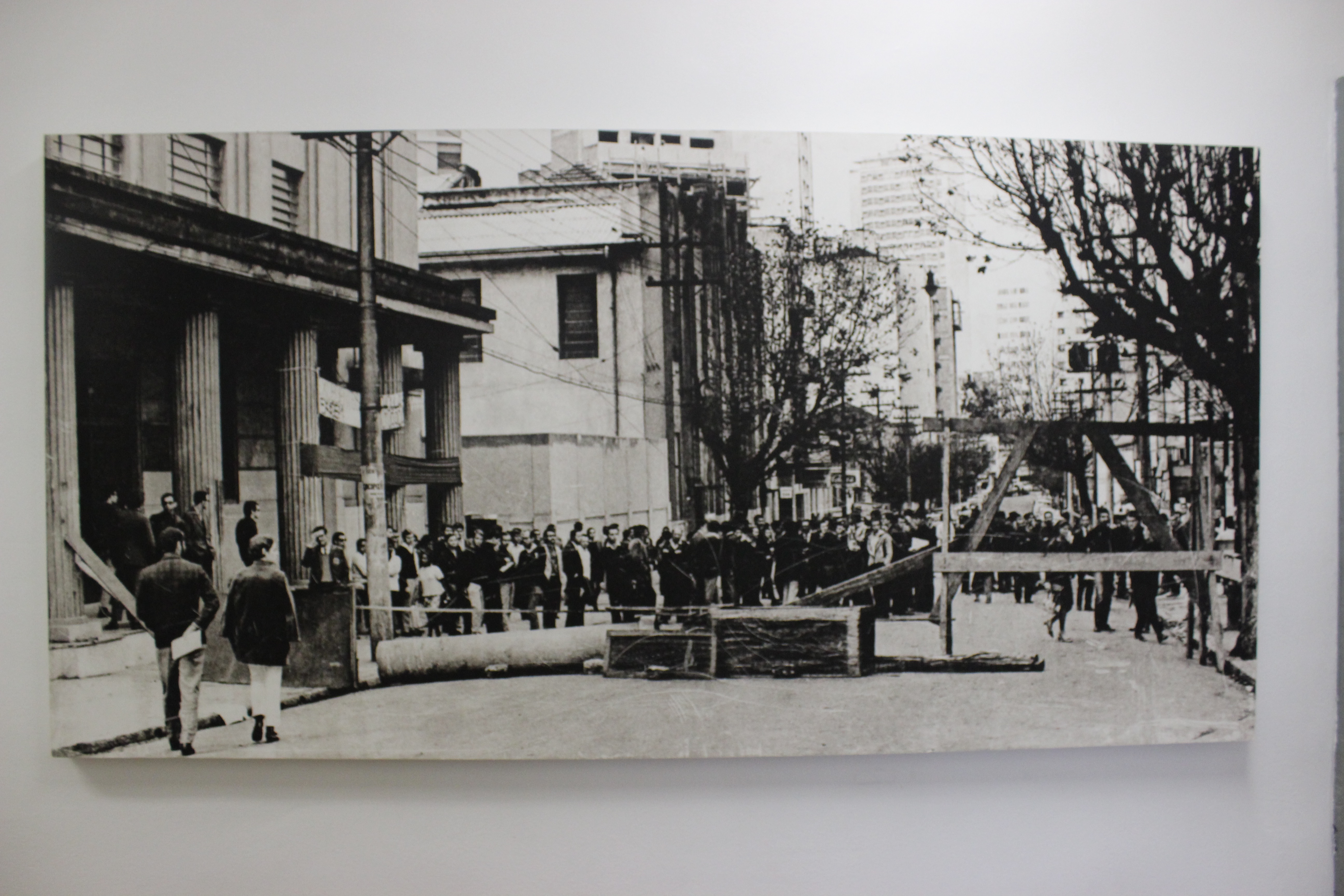
Students protesting against the military government in front of one of the university's buildings.

During the 1970s and part of the 1980s, some critics believed that USP underwent an intellectual dissection in terms of knowledge production and the quality of human resources. During the past decades, the university played an essential role in the discussion and dissemination of important political ideas that contributed to the democratization of the country, bringing together many leftist intellectuals (such as Florestan Fernandes, Boris Fausto, Paul Singer, Antonio Candido, Gioconda Mussolini among others).

During the Brazilian dictatorship, a large number of professors from USP were persecuted and even tortured – many were forced to leave the country. This slowed down scientific production in Brazil. It also promoted a systematic increase in the total number of graduate vacancies, encouraged by the state government.

The gap caused by the removal of teachers and students chased by the military regime was interrupted by the campaign of political amnesty in the early 1980s. Several units of USP celebrated the return of their deposed professors, although many of them were rehired under different conditions (former full professors took new positions as assistant professors).

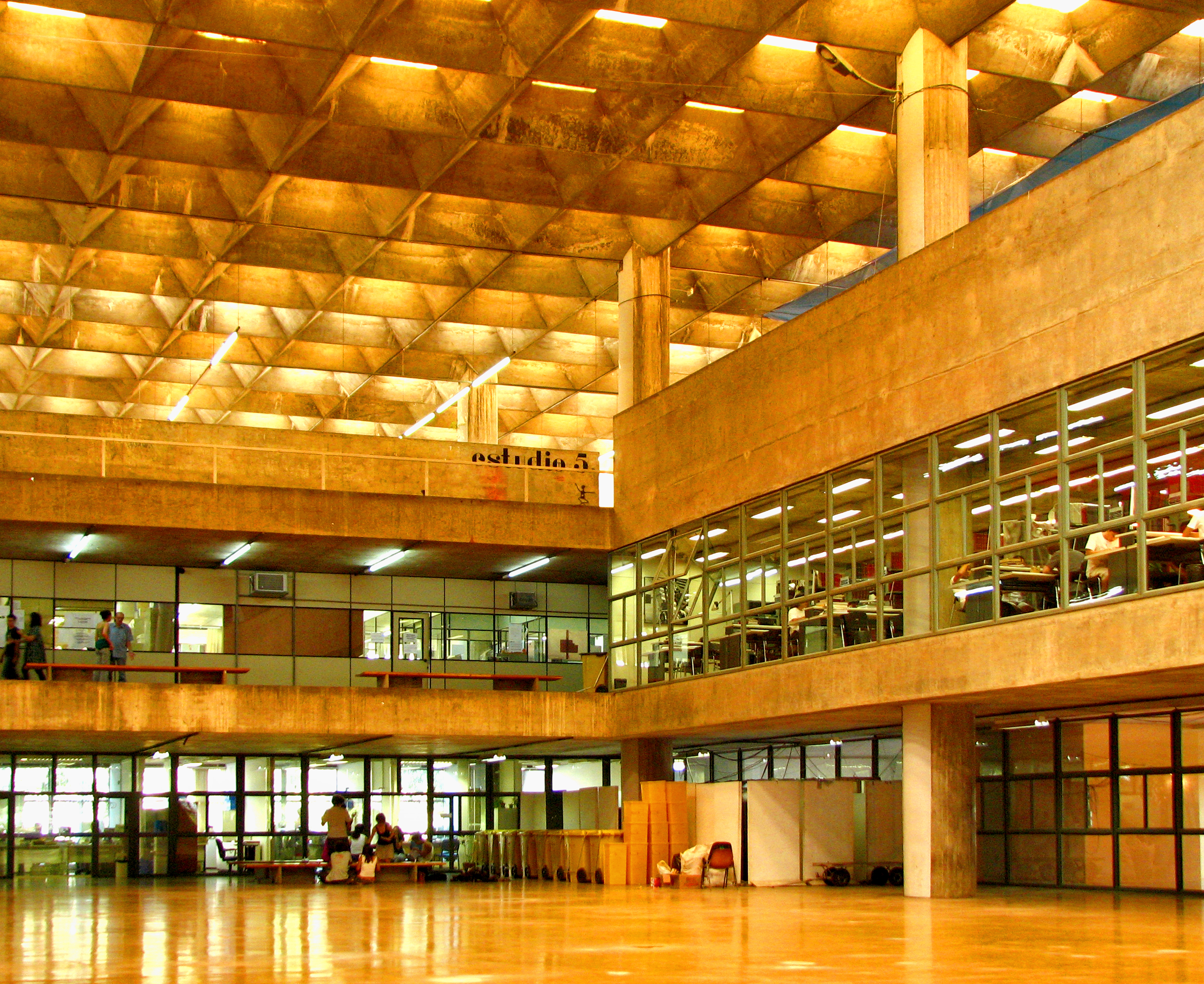
The most recent Architecture and Urbanism College's building

=== Expansion ===
Parallel to the resulting intellectual emptiness of political repression in the 1960s-80s, academic units were fragmented; new faculties and institutes were created, resulting in new courses, new lines of research, and graduate programs. Originally conceived as the university's academic core – gathering itself the various fields of knowledge – the FFCL (School of Philosophy, Sciences and Letters) saw its departments gain autonomy and become separate units. The Institute of Physics was the first department to extricate itself from the old FFCL, followed by other natural science departments.

In 2004, the university founded the Institute of International Relations to study global matters in a multidisciplinary environment (law, political science, economy, and history) with Brazilian and international students and professors (International Exchange Program). In 2005, it was built in the East Zone of the city of São Paulo a new School of Arts, Sciences, and Humanities (EACH), taking a few courses that go beyond the traditional Brazilian university model and aim to diversify the areas of the consolidated institution. [22] On 21 March 2006, USP approved the merger of a second School of Chemical Engineering (FAENQUIL) in the city of Lorena (rural area), at the Paraíba Valley (State of São Paulo's rural area), with about 1,600 students in total and of these 1,200 at graduation. In 2007, a second Law School was established in the city of Ribeirão Preto, also in the State of São Paulo's countryside.

== Academics ==
Today, USP has five hospitals and offers 247 undergraduate programs and 239 graduate programs in all areas of study. The university houses altogether 24 museums and galleries – with half a million visitors a year – two theaters, a cinema, a TV channel and an orchestra. The University of São Paulo welcomes people from all continents and stimulates this process via networks and consortiums (International Office – USP), such as Erasmus Mundus, Associação das Universidades de Língua Portuguesa, and Rede Magalhães (SMILE – Student Mobility in Latin America, Caribbean and Europe), among others.

=== Rankings ===
University rankings

Global – Overall
- ARWU World: 101–150 (2022)
- CWUR World: 109 (2023)
- CWTS World: 12 (2023)
- QS World: 108 (2026)
- THE World: 201–250 (2026)
- USNWR Global: =120 (2022–23)

According to ARWU, USP was classified in first place regarding the number of doctorates awarded during 2011. USP is ranked among the top 70 universities in the world, in the Ranking "Top Universities by Reputation 2013" published by Times Higher Education. According to the 2013 Academic Ranking of World Universities, USP is placed in the group of the 101–151 top world universities. According to the 2020 CWTS Leiden Ranking, the University of São Paulo is ranked 7th in the world. In the 2024 QS World University Rankings, the University of São Paulo ranked 85th in the world and is ranked 1st in Latin America. As of 2021, the University of São Paulo is the first Latin American institution in the Times Higher Education World University Rankings to be ranked at 201-250th.

=== Healthcare ===
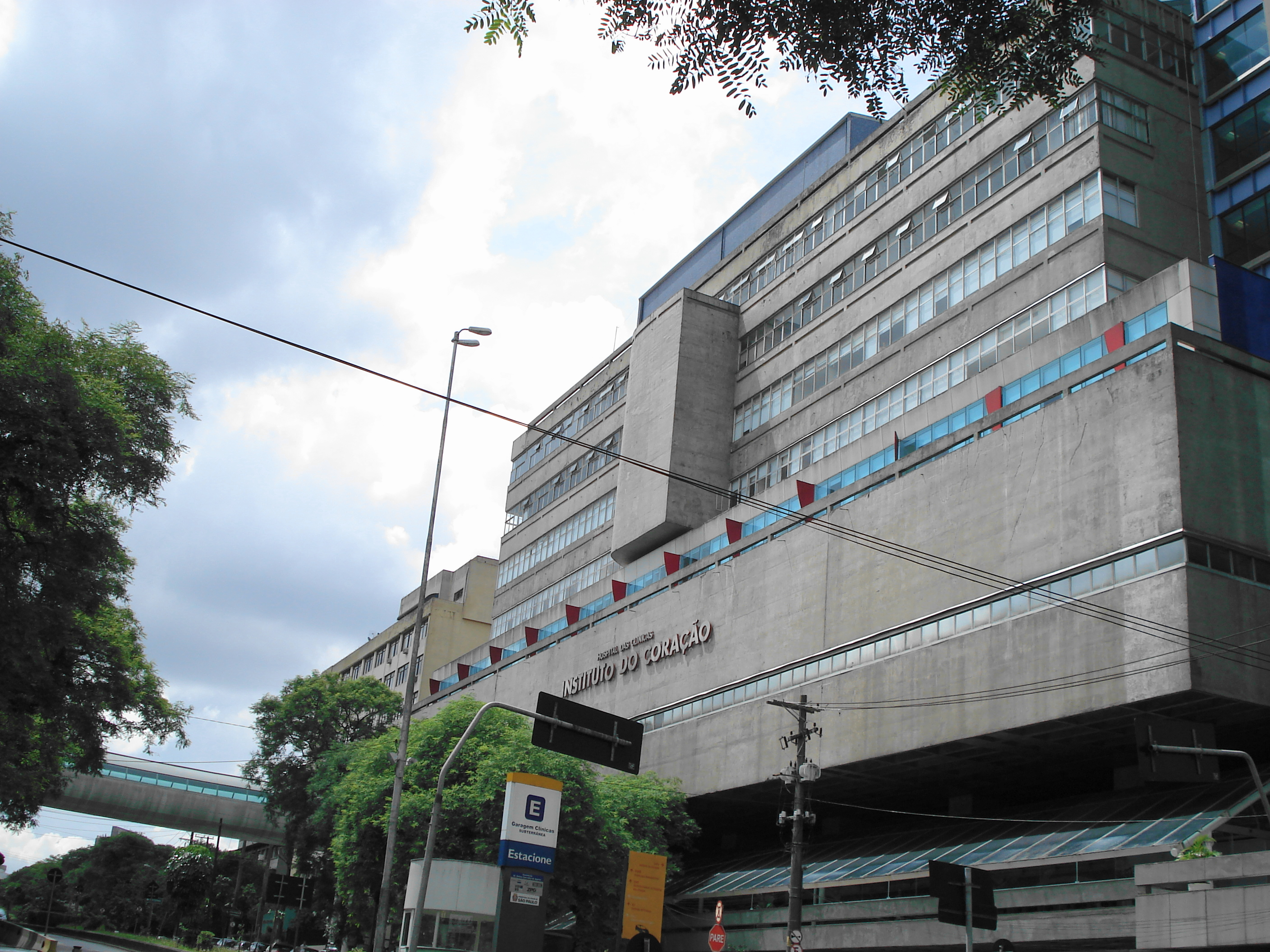
The Heart Institute of the University of São Paulo, part of the Clinics Hospital, the largest health complex in Latin America

USP operates four hospitals, among them University of São Paulo Medical School Public Hospital, the largest hospital complex in Latin America and the major teaching and training site for the university's Faculty of Medicine, which is highly ranked within Latin America. All of them are:

- University of São Paulo Medical School Public Hospital
- Heart Institute of the University of São Paulo
- Public Hospital of Ribeirão Preto Medical School
- Hospital de Reabilitação de Anomalias Craniofaciais – Centrinho

=== Library system ===
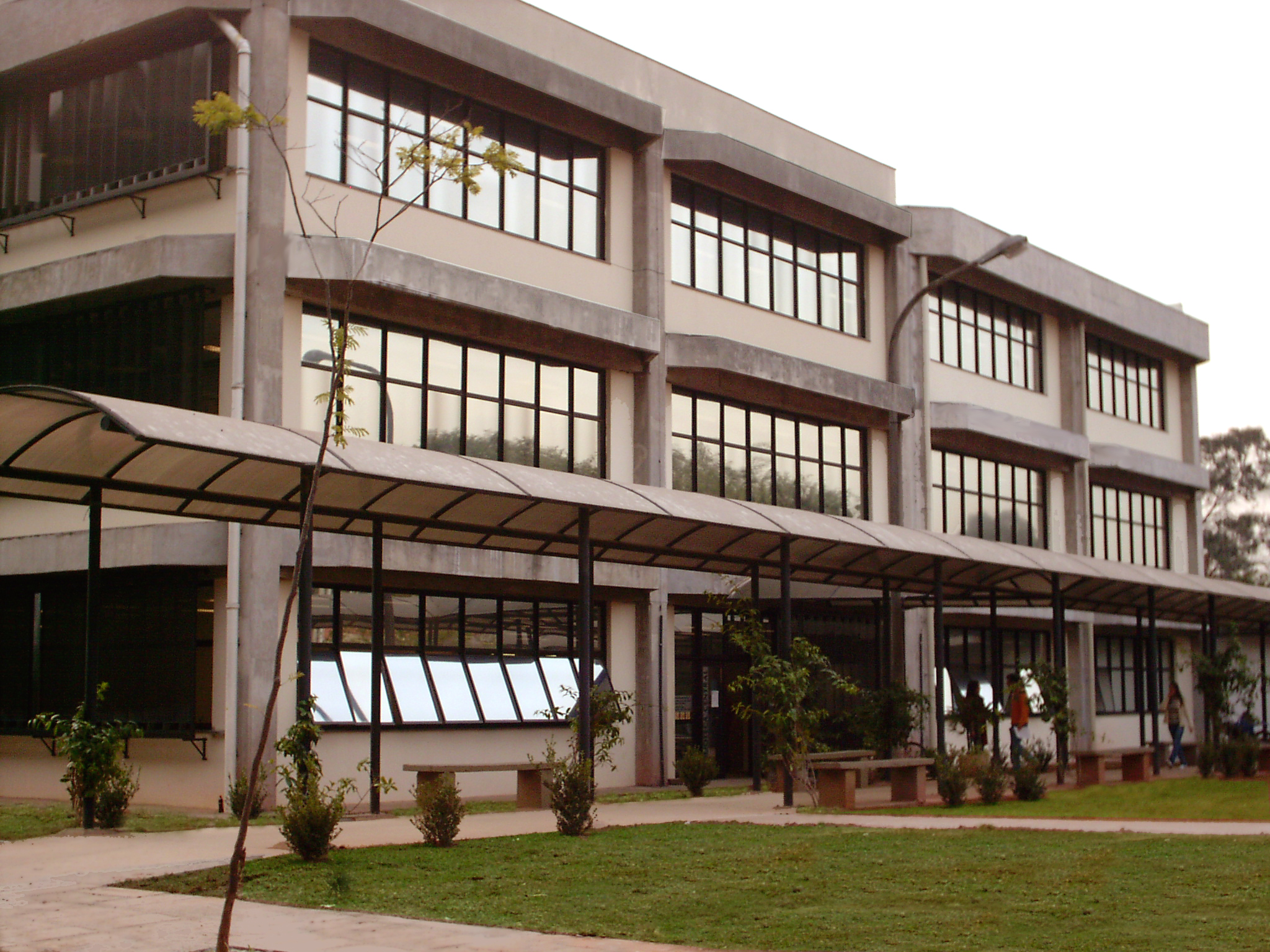
The Florestan Fernandes Library at the Faculty of Philosophy, Languages and Human Sciences.

USP has 42 libraries managed by the Integrated Library System (SIB – Sistema Integrado de Bibliotecas in Portuguese), which is also responsible for the university's online system, DEDALUS.

Dedalus is an online database that allows simultaneous consultation in all university libraries. It is also integrated into a system named Integrated Research, which integrates all online databases signed by the university. This makes academic research faster and provides researchers with easy access to international publications.

=== Museums and art galleries ===
The University of São Paulo manages a rich set of museums and art galleries, most of them located on the central campus in the city of São Paulo:

- Museu de Arte Contemporânea da Universidade de São Paulo (Museum of Contemporary Art)
- Museu Paulista (Historical Museum of São Paulo)
- Museu de Zoologia (Museum of Zoology)
- MAE-USP – Museu de Arqueologia e Etnologia (Museum of Archeology and Ethnology)
- Museu do Café Francisco Schmidt (Ribeirão Preto Campus)

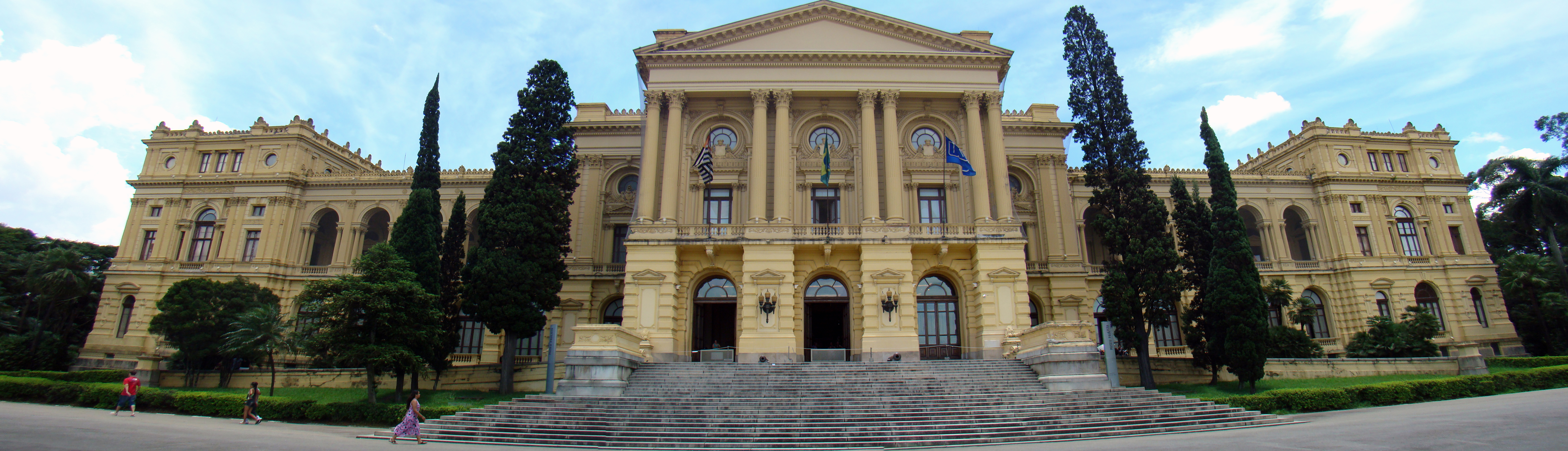
Panorama of the Museu do Ipiranga

=== Academic career ===
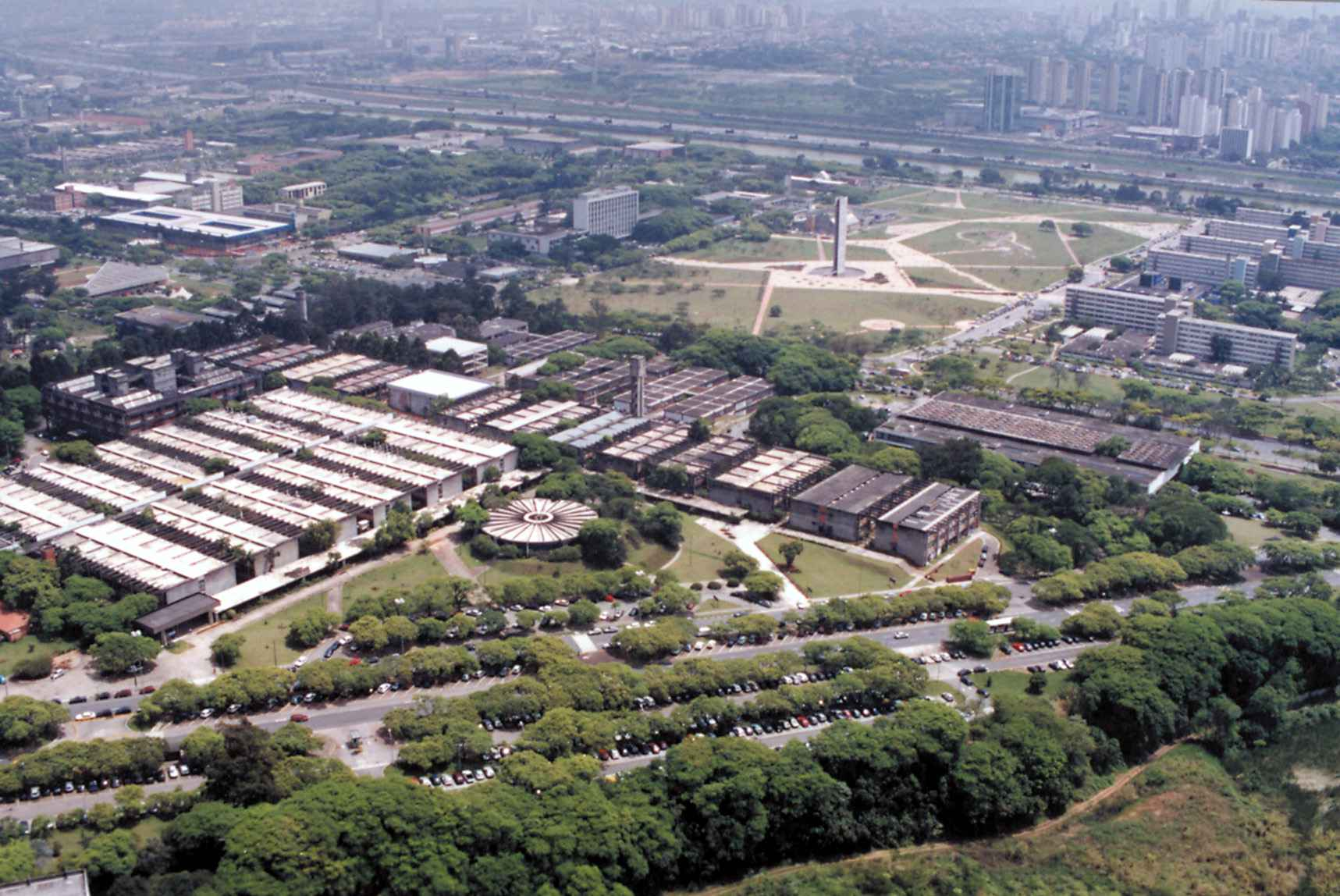
Aerial view of the university. The buildings on center are part of the IQ – Institute of Chemistry, Chemical Engineering and Pharmacy.

- Teaching Assistant (Auxiliar de Ensino)—MS-2 (must have a master's degree and be enrolled in a doctoral program). Undergraduate students can also be teaching assistants for a semester, with scholarships from each department.
- Professor Doctor (Professor Doutor) – MS-3 (must have a doctoral or equivalent degree).
- Associate Professor (Professor Associado) – MS-5 (must have a Livre Docente title; equivalent to the German Habilitation).
- Full Professor (Professor Titular) – MS-6 (top rank, only MS-6 professors can hold positions such as the Dean of a Faculty/School or the university's Rector).

== Admissions ==
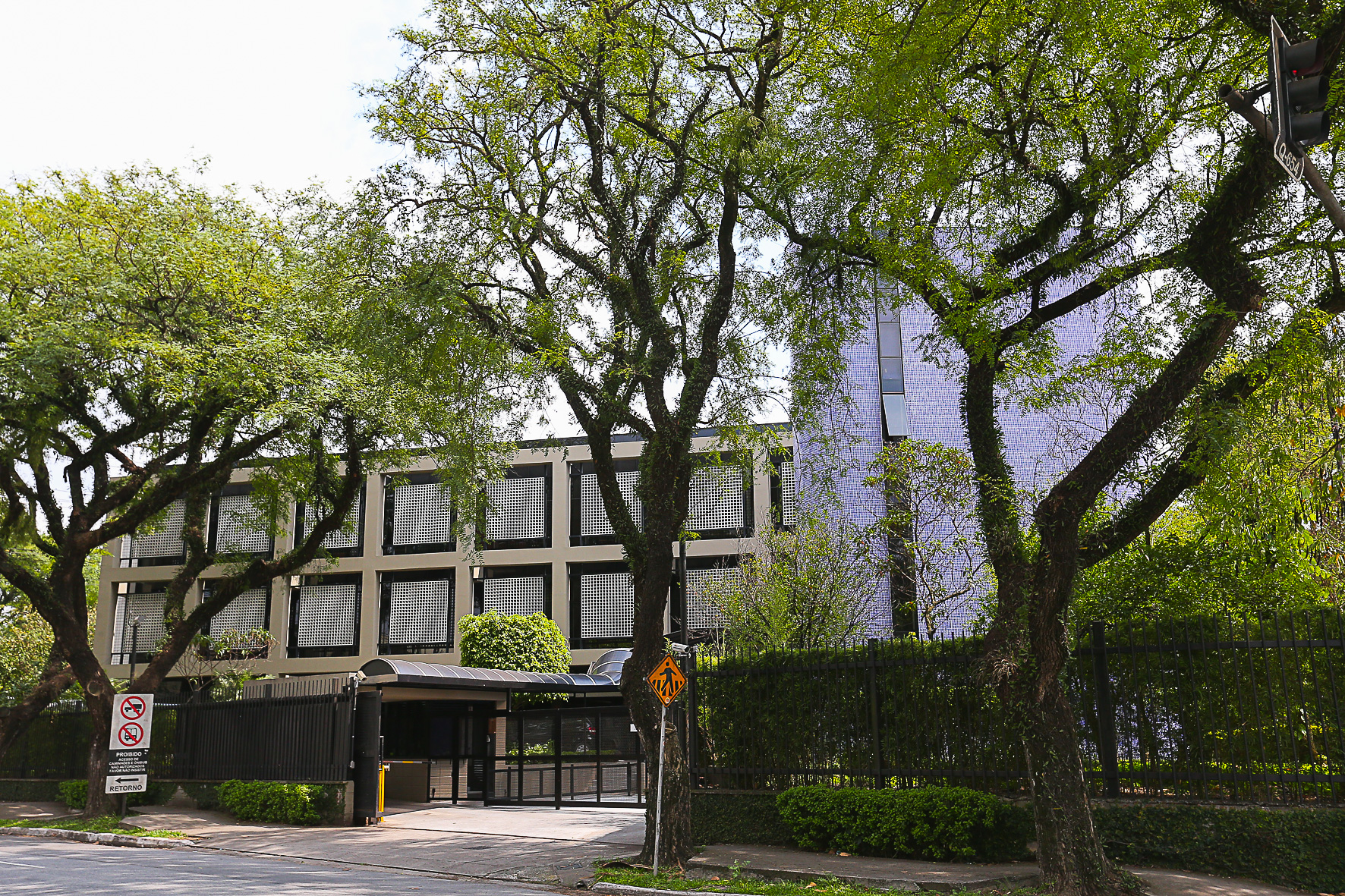
The FUVEST building, where the main admission exams are managed.

Brazilian students take USP's entrance exam, the vestibular, which is prepared and administered by FUVEST (University Foundation for Vestibular), subject to regulations approved by the university's Undergraduate Studies Council. In 2012, 159,603 students signed up for Fuvest's vestibular for 10,982 openings. Candidates must take a multiple-choice test involving chemistry, physics, mathematics, biology, geography, history, Portuguese, and English. The second round of tests is written and specific to the chosen field of studies, including more in-depth questions in physics, chemistry, and mathematics for engineering; history, math, and geography for law; and so on. In-depth written Portuguese questions are required for all.

More recently, students have also been able to access the university by taking the nationwide high school evaluation test, ENEM, through the Unified Selection System (SISU). Each undergraduate course manages the vacancies available for each admission process.

International students may come through several exchange programs. In 2012, USP hosted over 2,300 exchange students. Roughly a third of the international students are enrolled in humanities and social sciences, with another third in engineering courses.

USP does not require its students, national or foreign, to pay any tuition, as its source of funding comes from the state of São Paulo.

== Organization ==
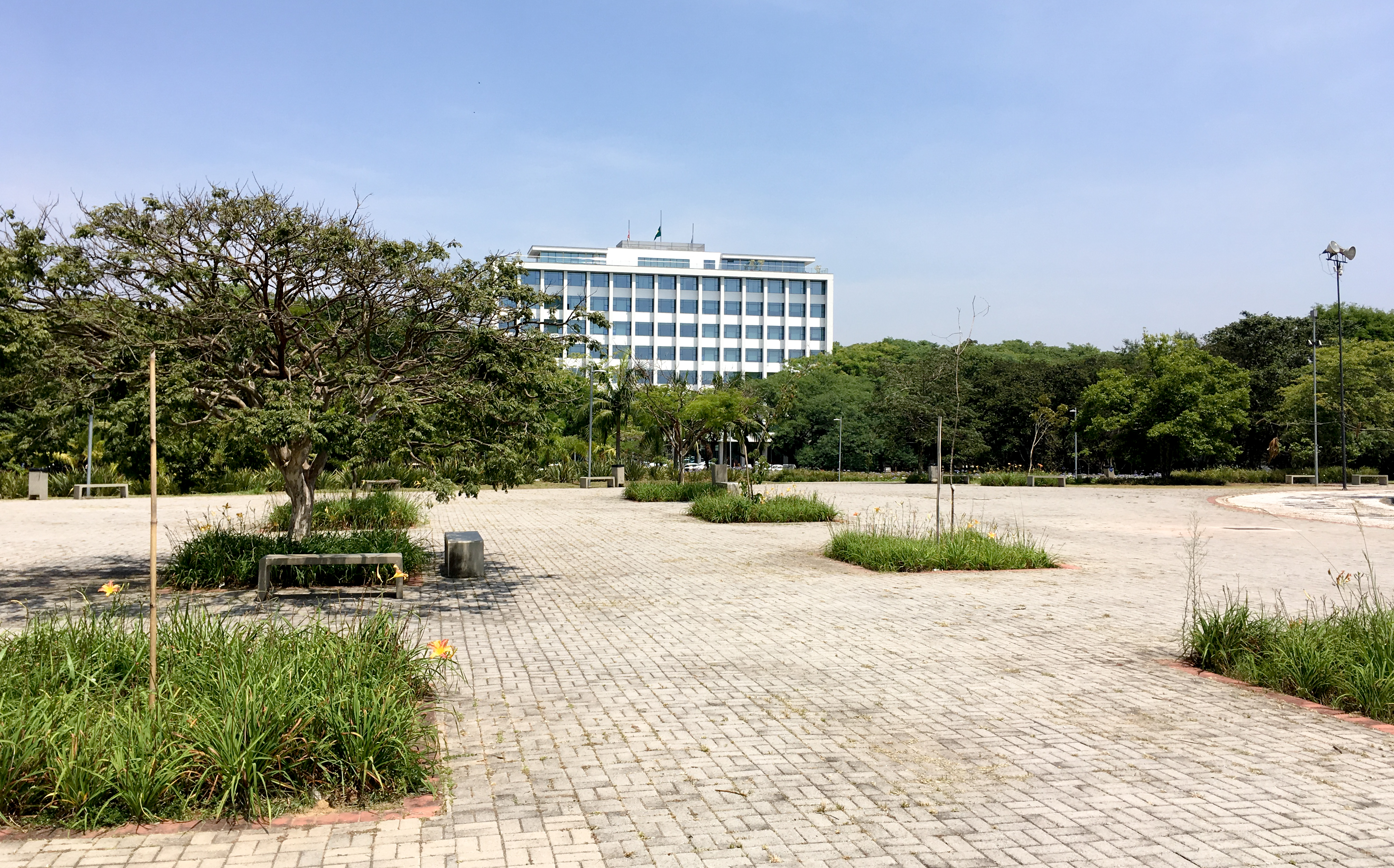
Seat of the USP Rectory.

USP corresponds to the idea of "university" as a set of autonomous schools, institutes, and colleges, each responsible for one area of knowledge (the aforementioned thirty-six teaching, research, and extension). Like most Brazilian universities, it grants autonomy to its teaching, research, and extension units regarding the didactic organization and curricular definition of each of the courses, which often results in a considered excessive fragmentation of teaching and research and the disconnection between the knowledge produced in each of the units.

Each unit is divided into departments. A department is usually responsible for one of the courses offered by the unit or for a specific search line. In the case of units with only one or two courses, departments are not responsible for the entire course but for a part of it. Due to the aforementioned fragmentation and decentralization of the university, it is common to see departments with similar profiles in different units, which raises criticism as to the effectiveness of public investments and duplication of efforts.

=== Administration ===
The administrative structure of USP has in the Rectory its central organ, as well as in the Rector the main figure of the university. Subordinated to the Rectory are the four Pro-Rectorates, specialized agencies in each of the university's fields of activity: Pro-Rectorate (PRG), Post-Graduation Pro-Rectorate (PRPG), Pro-Rectory of Research (PRP) and Pro-Rectory of Culture and Extension (PRC).

In recent years, there has been discussion about creating a Pro-Rectorate for Student Assistance, a subject that, according to critics, has always been considered secondary to the university's leaders.

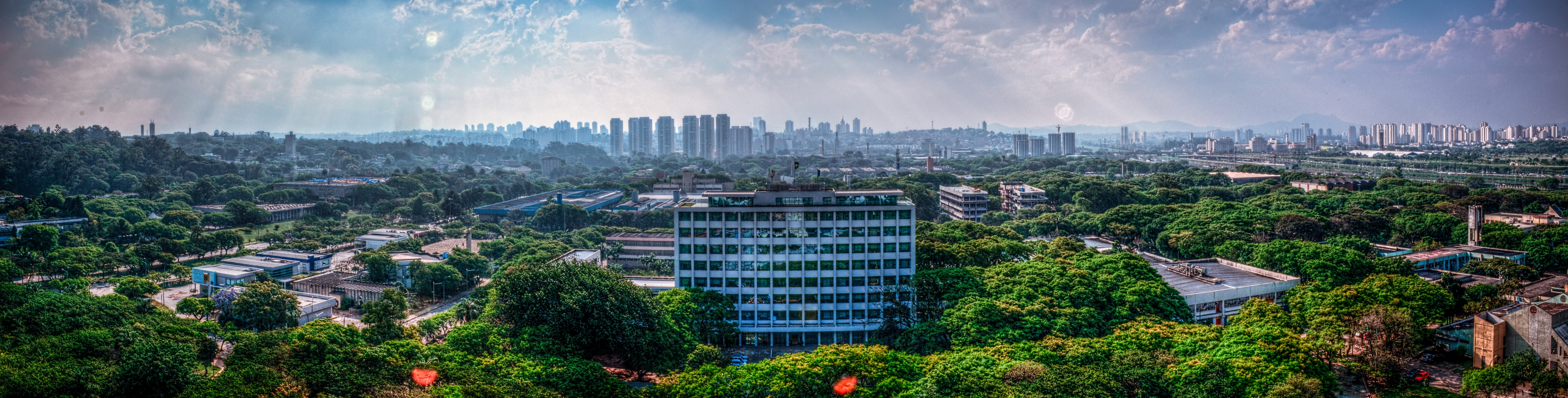
Panorama of the University City in São Paulo.

== In popular culture ==
- USP is referenced in Bernardo Kucinski's 2011 novel, K, a fictionalized account of the disappearance of an assistant lecturer in 1974 and her father's desperate attempt to find her.

== See also ==
- List of state universities in Brazil
- List of University of São Paulo alumni
- List of University of São Paulo faculty
- Rankings of universities in Brazil
- Universidade Estadual de Campinas (Unicamp)
- Universidade Estadual Paulista Júlio de Mesquita Filho (Unesp)
- Universities and Higher Education in Brazil
