= 1974 CFL draft =

Canadian football draft

The 1974 CFL draft composed of nine rounds where 97 Canadian football players were chosen from eligible Canadian universities and Canadian players playing in the NCAA. A total of 18 players were selected as territorial exemptions. Through trades with the Winnipeg Blue Bombers, the Toronto Argonauts selected first in the first, second, and sixth rounds.

== Territorial exemptions ==
Pick #	CFL team	Player	Position	University
-	Winnipeg Blue Bombers	Gordon Paterson	TB	Manitoba
-	Winnipeg Blue Bombers	Glen Perrin	TB	Bemidji State
-	Hamilton Tiger-Cats	Ted Greaves	WB	Ithaca
-	Hamilton Tiger-Cats	Gary Mueller	LB	Wilfrid Laurier
-	Calgary Stampeders	Murray Anderson	C	Calgary
-	Calgary Stampeders	Gordon Yeomans	TB	Washington State
-	BC Lions	Terry Bailey	TB	Simon Fraser
-	BC Lions	Loren Sherbina	DT	Idaho
-	Toronto Argonauts	Larry Uteck	DB	Wilfrid Laurier
-	Toronto Argonauts	Morris Zubkewych	DT	Simon Fraser
-	Saskatchewan Roughriders	Ken McEachern	DB	Weber State
-	Saskatchewan Roughriders	Laurie Skolrood	T	North Dakota
-	Montreal Alouettes	Gary Chown	LB	Bishop's
-	Montreal Alouettes	Gordon Knowlton	TB	Jacksonville State
-	Edmonton Eskimos	Dave Fennell	DT	North Dakota
-	Edmonton Eskimos	Bill Stevenson	DT	Drake
-	Ottawa Rough Riders	Perry Arnold	DB	Western Ontario
-	Ottawa Rough Riders	Darryl Craig	T	North Carolina

== 1st round ==
Pick #	CFL team	Player	Position	University
1	Toronto Argonauts	Randy Halsall	T	Wake Forest
2	Hamilton Tiger-Cats	Ken Clark	WR	Saint Mary's
3	Calgary Stampeders	Henry Janssen	TE	Western Ontario
4	BC Lions	Bob Hornes	DB	Idaho State
5	Toronto Argonauts	Larry Simpson	TE	Wilfrid Laurier
6	Saskatchewan Roughriders	Vic McLeod	DE	Western Ontario
7	Calgary Stampeders	Fraser MacDonald	LB	Saint Mary's
8	Ottawa Rough Riders	Dave Hadden	DB	Queen's
9	Ottawa Rough Riders	Darryl Craig	T	North Carolina

== 2nd round ==
Pick #	CFL team	Player	Position	University
10	Toronto Argonauts	Rick Konopka	LB	Wilfird Laurier
11	Hamilton Tiger-Cats	Tom Dufault	HB	LaCrosse State
12	Calgary Stampeders	Morris Cousineau	LB	Windsor
13	BC Lions	Mark Stevenson	DT	Simon Fraser
14	Edmonton Eskimos	Al Shemanchuk	DT	Alberta
15	Saskatchewan Roughriders	Leif Petterson	WR	Otterbein
16	Montreal Alouettes	Phil Levesque	G	Guelph
17	Hamilton Tiger-Cats	Andy Currie	DE	Acadia
18	Montreal Alouettes	Bob Petrie	WR	Western Ontario

== 3rd round ==
Pick #	CFL team	Player	Position	University
19	Winnipeg Blue Bombers	Derek Forbes	LB	McMaster
20	Hamilton Tiger-Cats	Frank Yakimchuk	T	Saint Mary's
21	Calgary Stampeders	Brian Hedges	T	Carleton
22	BC Lions	Andy Jonassen	DE	Calgary
23	Toronto Argonauts	Bill Baker	DB	British Columbia
24	Saskatchewan Roughriders	Duncan Findlay	TB	Whitworth
25	Montreal Alouettes	Michael Fenner	DT	Fordham
26	Edmonton Eskimos	Brian Heiland	TE	Simon Fraser
27	Ottawa Rough Riders	Bill Robinson	QB	Saint Mary's

== 4th round ==
Pick #	CFL team	Player	Position	University
28	Winnipeg Blue Bombers	David Semple	C	Simon Fraser
29	Hamilton Tiger-Cats	Peter McNab	DB	Queen's
30	Calgary Stampeders	Donn Sommerfeldt	LB	Whitworth
31	BC Lions	Dave Kaduhr	WR	Simon Fraser
32	Toronto Argonauts	Wayne Sudsbury	LB	Mount Allison
33	Saskatchewan Rough Riders	Brian Berg	G	Augsburg
34	Montreal Alouettes	Doug Smith	G	Wilfrid Laurier
35	Edmonton Eskimos	Peter Quigley	TB	Ottawa
36	BC Lions	Paul Kliger	LB	Ottawa

== 5th round ==
Pick #	CFL team	Player	Position	University
37	Winnipeg Blue Bombers	Geoff Sutherland	FB	Waterloo
38	Hamilton Tiger-Cats	Fred McLean	HB	Wilfrid Laurier
39	Calgary Stampeders	Len Bzdel	E	Saskatchewan
40	BC Lions	Joe Pal	DB	Queen's
41	Toronto Argonauts	Heinz Brademan	DT	Alberta
42	Saskatchewan Roughriders	Bruce Pazarena	Puget Sound	
43	Jim Allen	DT	Western Ontario	
44	Edmonton Eskimos	Rich Ellert	WR	Minot State
45	Ottawa Rough Riders	Tom Balfe	DT	Wilfrid Laurier

== 6th round ==
Pick #	CFL team	Player	Position	University
46	Toronto Argonauts	Jay Chapman	DE	Western Ontario
47	Hamilton Tiger-Cats	Ralph Corvino	DB	McMaster
48	Calgary Stampeders	Steve Fudge	E	Mount Allison
49	BC Lions	Herb Page	K	Kent State
50	Toronto Argonauts	John Dionisi	WR	Acadia
51	Saskatchewan Roughriders	Vance Curtis	TE	Alberta
52	Montreal Alouettes	Rick Griffiths	C	Wilfrid Laurier
53	Edmonton Eskimos	Stuart Lang	WR	Queen's
54	Ottawa Rough Riders	Jeff Cope	DB	Simon Fraser

== 7th round ==
Pick #	CFL team	Player	Position	University
55	Winnipeg Blue Bombers	Rick Howse	FB	Waterloo
56	Hamilton Tiger-Cats	Dave Lane	DB	Guelph
57	Calgary Stampeders	Ron Southwick	DE	McMaster
58	BC Lions	Charlie Campbell	DE	Simon Fraser
59	Toronto Argonauts	Bob Spree	QB	Waterloo
60	Hamilton Tiger-Cats	Doug Ward	DB	York
61	Montreal Alouettes	Jim Boltin	LB	Otterbein
62	Edmonton Eskimos	Neil Falkeid	T	Alberta
63	Ottawa Rough Riders	Doug Ridding	LB	Otterbein

== 8th round ==
Pick #	CFL team	Player	Position	University
64	Winnipeg Blue Bombers	Carl Knovac	DE	Bridgeport
65	Hamilton Tiger-Cats	Jamie Porteous	DB	New Brunswick
66	Calgary Stampeders	Bruce Morris	HB	Guelph
67	BC Lions	Bob Osness	E	Augsburg
68	Toronto Argonauts	John Wintermeyer	TB	Queen's
69	Hamilton Tiger-Cats	Dave Lawson	QB	McMaster
70	Montreal Alouettes	Howard Hills	WR	Acadia
71	Edmonton Eskimos	Tony Pugliese	LB	Alberta

== 9th round ==
Pick #	CFL team	Player	Position	University
72	Winnipeg Blue Bombers	John Malus	DE	Manitoba
73	Hamilton Tiger-Cats	Dave Hutton	LB	Guelph
74	Calgary Stampeders	Art Carefoote	T	Guelph
75	BC Lions	Mike Lapensee	K	Loyola
76	Toronto Argonauts	Tom Graham	C	Guelph
77	Hamilton Tiger-Cats	Craig Holt	WR	Guelph
78	Montreal Alouettes	Terry Clement	LB	Eastern Washington
79	Edmonton Eskimos	Blake Walker	G	Saskatchewan
