= Sérgio Brandão =

Brazilian TV journalist and science communicator

Sergio Moraes Castanheira Brandão
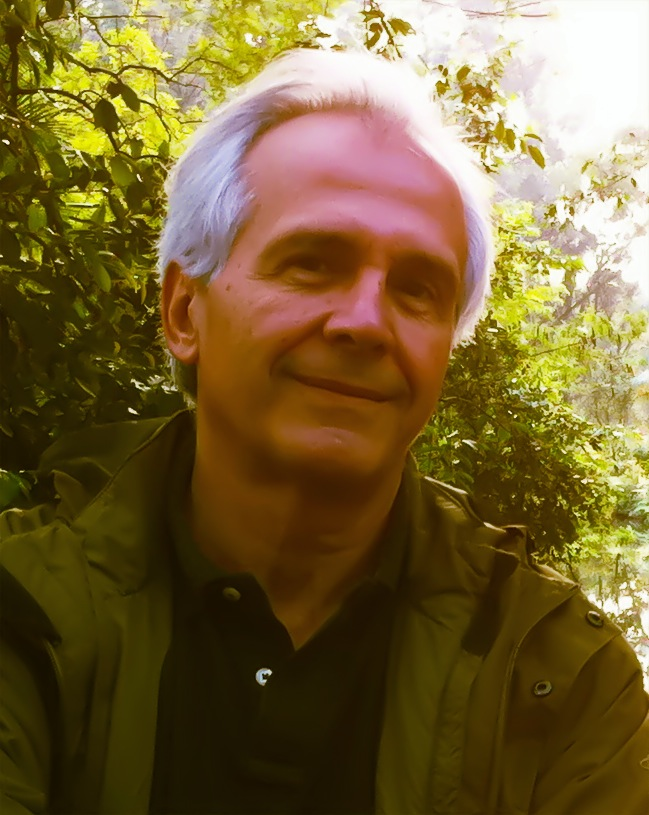

Sergio Moraes Castanheira Brandão is a Brazilian TV journalist and science communicator, born in Rio de Janeiro, in 1949.

He is the International Curator of the Ver Ciência - International Exhibition of Science on TV, a festival of television programs about science and technology, which takes place annually in Brazil, since 1994. The main objective of the Ver Ciência is to promote the dissemination of scientific culture and knowledge through television.

Sergio M C Brandão's career as science communicator began at the BBC World Service, in London, where he worked from 1974 to 1981 as producer, reporter and presenter of radio programs broadcast to Brazil, mainly on science and technology subjects. His career on television began in 1981 at the Globo TV network, as reporter for prime time programmes such as "Fantástico" and "Globo Repórter". In 1984 he participated in the creation of the first regular (weekly) science TV program in Brazil, which was broadcast continuously until 2014 by the Globo TV network.

For his dedication to science communication, Sergio M C Brandão has won awards in Brazil and abroad, such as the Prêmio José Reis de Divulgação Científica (1986), an honor given annually by the National Council of Scientific and Technological Development (CNPq), the Primo Rovis Prize (1991) of the Trieste International Foundation for the Progress and Freedom of Science (Italy), and two nominations by the Brazilian Academy of Sciences to UNESCO's Kalinga Prize for best science communicators.
