= List of television festivals =

This is a list of notable television festivals.

== Television festivals ==
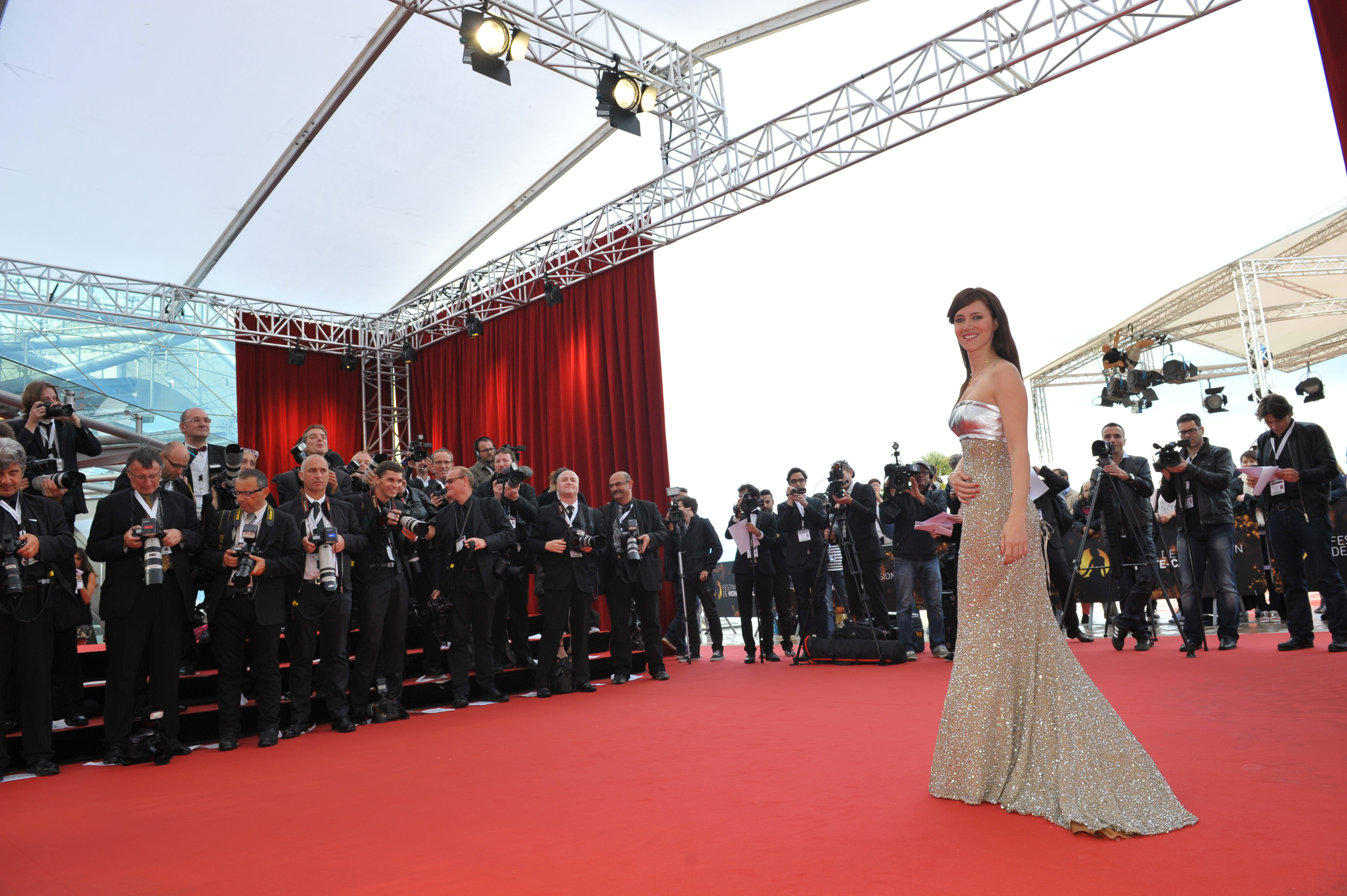
The red carpet at the Monte-Carlo Television Festival

- &actioninternational media festival, Norway
- ATX Television Festival, USA
- Banff World Media Festival, Canada
- BRITDOC Foundation, England
- Canneseries, Cannes, France
- Celtic Media Festival
- Edinburgh International Television Festival, Scotland
- Festival International de Programmes Audiovisuels, France
- FesTVal, Spain
- ITVFest (Independent Television Festival)
- Monte-Carlo Television Festival, Monaco
- New York Television Festival, USA
- North Fork TV Festival, USA
- Panafrican Film and Television Festival of Ouagadougou, Burkina Faso
- Serial Killer, Czech Republic
- Seriencamp Germany
- SeriesFest, USA
- Series Mania, France
- Venice TV Awards, Venice
- VerCiência, Brazil

== See also ==
- Film festival
- List of FESPACO award winners
- List of festivals
- Lists of festivals – festival list articles on Wikipedia
