= Brazilian Academy of Sciences =

National academy in Brazil

Academia Brasileira de Ciências
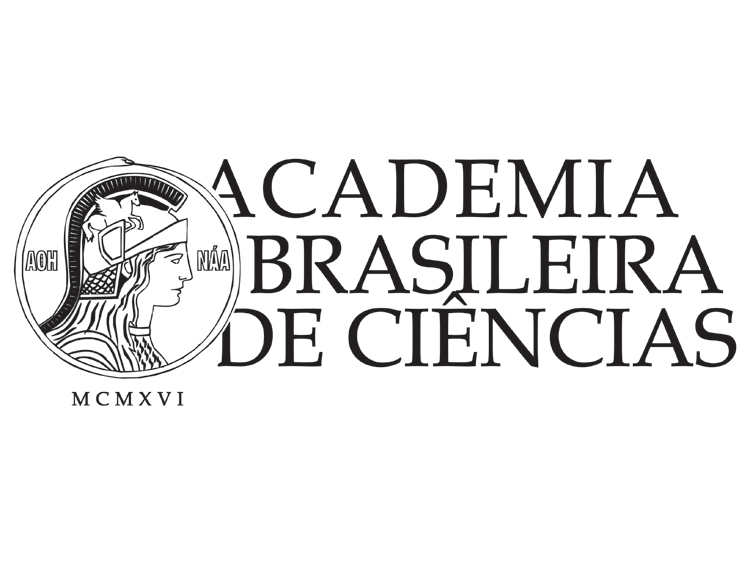
- Formation: May 3, 1916
- Headquarters: Rio de Janeiro, Rio de Janeiro, Brazil
- President: Helena Nader
- Website: www.abc.org.br

The Brazilian Academy of Sciences (Portuguese: Academia Brasileira de Ciências or ABC) is the national academy of Brazil. It is headquartered in the city of Rio de Janeiro and was founded on May 3, 1916.

== Publications ==
It publishes a large number of scientific publications, among them the Anais da Academia Brasileira de Ciências (2020 IF 1.280). At the same time, it is in charge of granting prestigious international awards for outstanding work in scientific endeavors.

== People ==
=== Presidents ===
- 1916–1926 Henrique Charles Morize
- 1926–1929 Juliano Moreira
- 1929–1931 Miguel Osório de Almeida
- 1931–1933 Eusébio Paulo de Oliveira
- 1933–1935 Arthur Alexandre Moses
- 1935–1937 Álvaro Alberto da Mota e Silva
- 1937–1939 Adalberto Menezes de Oliveira
- 1939–1941 Inácio Manuel Azevedo do Amaral
- 1941–1943 Arthur Alexandre Moses
- 1943–1945 Cândido Firmino de Melo Leitão
- 1945–1947 Mario Paulo de Brito
- 1947–1949 Arthur Alexandre Moses
- 1949–1951 Álvaro Alberto da Mota e Silva
- 1951–1965 Arthur Alexandre Moses
- 1965–1967 Carlos Chagas Filho
- 1967–1981 Aristides Pacheco Leão
- 1981–1991 Maurício Peixoto
- 1991–1993 Oscar Sala
- 1993–2007 Eduardo Krieger
- 2007–2016 Jacob Palis Jr.
- 2016–2022 Luiz Davidovich
- 2022–present Helena Nader

=== Notable members ===
ABC has a distinguished array of national and international members, among them:

- Alain Meunier
- Alfred Maddock
- Alvaro Penteado Crosta
- Amir Ordacgi Caldeira
- Antonio Galves
- Aziz Nacib Ab'Saber
- Carl Djerassi
- Carlos Henrique de Brito Cruz
- Charles D. Michener
- Chen Ning Yang
- Chintamani Nagesa Ramachandra Rao
- Claude Cohen-Tannoudji
- Constantino Tsallis
- Crodowaldo Pavan
- D. Allan Bromley
- David Goldstein
- David Henry Peter Maybury-Lewis
- Edmundo de Souza e Silva
- Eduardo Moacyr Krieger
- Eduardo Oswaldo Cruz
- Ernst Wolfgang Hamburger
- Harold Max Rosenberg
- Henry Taube
- Jayme Tiomno
- Jean-Christophe Yoccoz
- Jens Martin Knudsen
- João Lucas Marques Barbosa
- John Campbell Brown
- José Goldemberg
- José Leite Lopes
- Liu Hsu
- Luiz Pinguelli Rosa
- Larry Simpson
- Marcia C. Barbosa
- Marco Antonio Zago
- Marcos Moshinsky
- Maurício Rocha e Silva
- Mayana Zatz
- Mildred S. Dresselhaus
- Nicole Marthe Le Douarin
- Nivio Ziviani
- Norman Ernest Borlaug
- Nuno Alvares Pereira
- Oscar Sala
- Oswaldo Frota-Pessoa
- Peter H. Raven
- Pierre Gilles de Gennes
- Ricardo Renzo Brentani
- Richard Darwin Keynes
- Richard Williams
- Sérgio Henrique Ferreira
- Simon Schwartzman
- Stanley Kirschner
- Stefan Laufer
- Wilhelm Hasselbach
- Walter S. Leal
- Warwick Estevam Kerr
- William Sefton Fyfe
- Amilcar Tanuri
