= Prêmio José Reis de Divulgação Científica =

Annual honor

The Prêmio José Reis de Divulgação Científica (Portuguese: José Reis Science Communication Award) is an annual honor awarded by the Brazilian Council of Scientific and Technological Development (CNPq) to the institution, media organization, publication, or individual who most contributed to the dissemination and public awareness of science and technology in Brazil. It is thus named in honor of Dr. José Reis, a Brazilian biologist and science writer who was one of the pioneers in the field.

== Laureates ==
- 2016: Luisa Massarani.
- 2015: Fundação Oswaldo Cruz. Honorable mention: Bahia Science and Technology State Department
- 2014: Herton Abacherli Escobar - from O Estado de S. Paulo newspaper.
- 2013: Ildeu de Castro Moreira - from Federal University of Rio de Janeiro.
- 2012: Fundação Joaquim Nabuco – (Fundaj) – MEC. Honorable mention: Instituto de Estudos Avançados - USP/São Carlos.
- 2011: Ana Lucia Azevedo - from O Globo newspaper.
- 2010: Roberto Lent - from Federal University of Rio de Janeiro.
- 2009: Espaço Ciência - from Pernambuco Science, Technology and Environment State Department.
- 2008: Alicia Ivanissevich, from Ciência Hoje Magazine, edited by the Brazilian Society for the Advancement of Science. Honorable mention: Marluce Moura, editor-in-chief of Revista Pesquisa Fapesp, edited by the São Paulo Foundation for the Support of Science.
- 2007: Jeter Jorge Bertoletti, from the Pontifical Catholic University of Rio Grande do Sul.
- 2006: Centro Brasileiro de Pesquisas Físicas. Honorable Mention: Fundação de Amparo à Pesquisa do Piauí and Memorial da Câmara Municipal de Porto Alegre
- 2005: Marcelo Nogueira Leite (Folha de S.Paulo). Honorable Mention: Verônica Falcão Souto (Jornal do Commércio) and Lana Cristina do Carmo (Agência Radiobrás)
- 2004: Vanderlei Salvador Bagnat (Universidade de São Paulo). Honorable Mention: Suzana Carvalho Herculano Houzel (Universidade Federal do Rio de Janeiro)
- 2003: Fundação Zoobotânica do Rio Grande do Sul. Honorable Mentions: Radiobrás and Televisão Capital de Fortaleza (TV Diário).
- 2002: Fabiola Imaculada de Oliveira (Universidade de São Paulo)
- 2001: Marcelo Gleiser (Dartmouth College)
- 2000: Fundação de Amparo à Pesquisa do Estado de São Paulo. Honorable Mention: Museu de Astronomia e Ciências Afins (MAST)
- 1999: José Hamilton Ribeiro (Globo Network). Honorable Mention: Ulisses Capozoli (O Estado de S. Paulo).
- 1998: Samuel Murgel Branco (Universidade de São Paulo). Honorable Mentions: Nelio Marco Vincenzo Bizzo (Universidade de São Paulo) and Aldo da Cunha Medeiros (Universidade Federal do Rio Grande do Norte)
- 1997: Jornal do Commércio de Recife. Honorable Mention: Centro de Ciências da Secretaria de Estado de Ciência e Tecnologia do Estado do Rio de Janeiro; Espaço Museu Vida da Fundação Oswaldo Cruz (Fiocruz) and Projeto Espaço Ciência, Secretaria de Ciência, Tecnologia e Meio Ambiente do Estado de Pernambuco.
- 1996: Roberto Barros de Carvalho (Revista Ciência Hoje). Honorable Mention: Cláudio Roberto Cordovil Oliveira (Jornal do Brasil).
- 1995: Ângelo Barbosa Monteiro Machado (Universidade Federal de Minas Gerais). Honorable Mention: Samuel Murgel Branco (Universidade de São Paulo).
- 1993: Ernst Wolfgang Hamburger (Universidade de São Paulo), José Monserrat Filho (Jornal Ciência Hoje) and Agência de Comunicação da Universidade Federal de Santa Catarina.
- 1992: Renato M.E. Sabbatini (Faculdade de Ciências Médicas da Universidade Estadual de Campinas); Martha San Juan França (O Estado de S. Paulo). Honorable Mentions: João Carlos Pinheiro da Fonseca, Revista Telebrasil and Produtora EMA Vídeo
- 1991: Not awarded. Honorable Mention: Moacyr Costa Ferreira (Faculdade de Ciências Exatas e Experimentais de Guaxupé), Erika Franziska Herd Werneck (Departamento de Comunicação do Instituto de Artes e Comunicação da Universidade Federal Fluminense). Honorable Mention: Roberto Barros de Carvalho and Alicia Maria Ivanissevich (Revista Ciência Hoje). Institution: Revista Ciência Hoje das Crianças (SBPC). Honorable Mention: Caderno Vida, Jornal Zero Hora and Agência Brasil
- 1990: Virgínia Torres Schall (Instituto de Biologia, Fiocruz) and Ricardo Bonalume Neto (Jornal Folha de S.Paulo). Institution: Revista Superinteressante (Editora Abril)
- 1989: Andrejus Korolkovas (Faculdade de Ciências Farmacêuticas da Universidade de São Paulo). Honorable Mention: Júlio César Lobo (Jornal A Tarde). Institution: Estação Ciência, Conselho Nacional de Desenvolvimento Científico e Tecnológico. Honorable Mention: Instituto Butantan
- 1988: Roberto Muylaert Tinoco and Conceição Lemes, Revista Saúde. Honorable Mention: Marina Pires do Rio Caldeira (Folha da Manhã). Institution: Feira de Tecnologia da Universidade Estadual de Campinas.
- 1987: Messias Carrera (Sociedade Brasileira de Entomologia), Diógenes Vieira Silva (Diário do Grande ABC). Honorable Mention: Ivo Egon Stigger (Jornal Zero Hora). Institution: Museu Paraense Emílio Goeldi. Honorable Mention: Fundação para o Desenvolvimento do Ensino de Ciência - FUNBEC
- 1986: Júlio Abranczyk (Jornal Folha de S.Paulo), Sergio Moraes Castanheira Brandão. Institution: Instituto de Arqueologia Brasileira – IAB.
- 1985: Maria Julieta Sebastiani Ormastroni (Instituto Brasileiro de Educação, Ciência e Cultura – IBECC). Honorable Mention: Andrejus Korolkovas (USP). Ethevaldo Mello de Siqueira (Revista Nacional de Telemática). Honorable Mention: Ulisses Capozoli (Folha de S.Paulo). Institution: Globo Ciência TV program (Fundação Roberto Marinho and Globo Vídeo). Honorable Mention: Programa "Encontro Com a Ciência", SBPC.
- 1984: Gilberto de Souza Soares de Almeida (Fundação Universidade Estadual de Maringá). Honorable Mention: Luis Gonzaga Engelberg Lordello, Escola Superior de Agricultura Luiz de Queiroz da Universidade de São Paulo), Claudio Savaget and Elza Kawakami Savaget. Institution: Diário do Grande ABC. Honorable Mention: Museu de Pré-História "Paulo Duarte" da Universidade de São Paulo.
- 1983: Hitoshi Nomura (Escola Superior de Agricultura "Luiz de Queiroz"). Silvio Raimundo (Revista Visão). Institution: Equipe "Globo Rural" (Globo Network). Institution: Revista Ciência Hoje (SBPC). Honorable Mention: Jornal Folha de S.Paulo.
- 1982: Carlos da Silva Lacaz (Sociedade Brasileira para o Progresso da Ciência). Honorable Mention: Revista Ciência Hoje, SBPC
- 1980: Oswaldo Frota-Pessoa (Universidade de São Paulo). Honorable Mention: Maria Julieta Sebastiani Ormastroni (Fundação Brasileira de Ensino de Ciências)
- 1978: Ronaldo Rogério de Freitas Mourão (Observatório Nacional)
