= Carlos Henrique de Brito Cruz =

Brazilian physicist (born 1956)

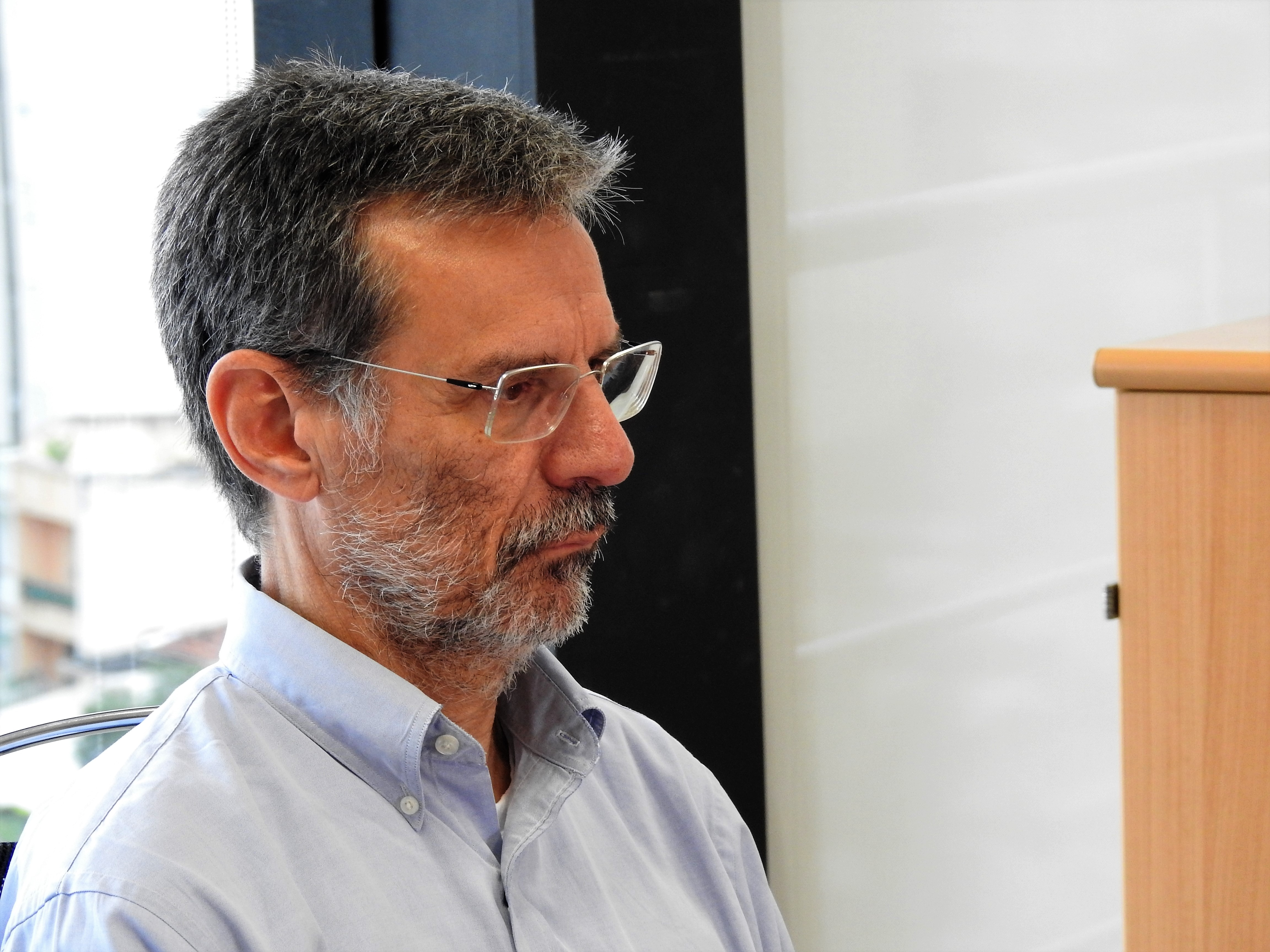
- Born: July 19, 1956 (age 70); Rio de Janeiro
- Scientific career
- Institutions: São Paulo Research Foundation
- Website: www.fapesp.br/en/42

Carlos Henrique de Brito Cruz, born in Rio de Janeiro on July 19, 1956, is one of Brazil's most noted physicists and a member of the Brazilian Academy of Sciences. The scientific director of the São Paulo Research Foundation (FAPESP) and a full professor of quantum electronics at the Gleb Wataghin Physics Institute at the State University of Campinas (UNICAMP), Brito Cruz is engaged in research in which he uses femtosecond lasers to study ultrafast phenomena.

== Education ==
Brito Cruz began his studies in Electrical Engineering at the Instituto Tecnológico da Aeronáutica (ITA) in 1974 and received his degree in 1978. He received an M.Sc. degree in physics in 1980 and a D.Sc. degree in physics in 1983, both from the Gleb Wataghin Physics Institute at the Universidade Estadual de Campinas (State University at Campinas), popularly known as UNICAMP.

== Career and research ==
In 1981-82 he was a researcher at Istituto Italo Latino Americano, Laboratório de Óptica Quântic at the University of Rome. He was named a “Professor MS4” in Physics at UNICAMP in 1986. In 1986-87 he was a researcher at AT&T Bell Laboratories in Holmdel, New Jersey. In 1989 he was named a “Professor MS5” in Physics at UNICAMP.

In 1989 he was visiting professor at the Laboratoire de Physique des Solides de l´Université de Paris V; in 1990 he was a researcher at AT&T Bell Laboratories in Murray Hill, New Jersey. In 1994 he was promoted to “Professor MS6” at UNICAMP, and continues to hold that title.

He was Director of the Physics Institute at UNICAMP from 1991 to 1994 and from 1998 to the present. He was Dean of Research at UNICAMP from 1994 to 1998, and from April 2002 to April 2005 was Rector of UNICAMP.

He is a member of the Superior Council of FAPESP, has been its president twice (1996–98 and 1998–2000), and since April 2005 he has been its Scientific Director. FAPESP is a foundation that is supported by São Paulo taxpayers and that is one of Brazil's leading funders of scientific research. At FAPESP he oversees the review of 18,000 research proposals every year. Under his direction FAPESP has supported research in all scientific disciplines and organized special programs in Bioenergy and Global Climate Change.

Brito Cruz and his team have shown “that 6 femtosecond pulses, which are only three optical cycles long, could be generated by compensating dispersion to third-order. These short pulses allowed studies to be done in bacteriorhodopsin, organic dyes and semiconductor films.”

=== Other professional activities ===
From 1995 to 1999 he was vice-president of the Brazilian Physical Society (SBF); he has served as editor of the Revista Brasileira de Física Aplicada e Instrumentação. He was also coordinator or director of several events sponsored by the International Center for Theoretical Physics (ICTP) in Trieste and was a member of the International Advisory Committee of the Optical Society of America. In 2010 Brito Cruz was a member of the 12-member special committee formed by the Inter Academy Council, at the request of the U.N. Secretary General, to review the procedures of IPCC.

Brito Cruz gave the keynote address at a 2012 event at the Woodrow Wilson International Center for Scholars in Washington, D.C. He argued that Brazil needs not only higher funding levels for university-level research, but also “more institutions devoted to higher learning and research, with more researchers. Per million inhabitants, Brazil has one-fourth the number of researchers compared to Spain, and one-eighth the number in South Korea.” He suggested that the establishment of new universities financed by federal-state collaboration could result in “institutions that rank among the hundred best in the world in ten years” and could create “opportunities for more young people while developing science and technology in Brazil.”

Also in 2012, he gave a plenary session at the Latin America Optics & Photonics Conference (LAOP) in São Sebastião, Brazil. His subject was “Science and Technology in Brazil.” In the same year he visited Madrid in an effort to promote collaboration between scientists and science educators in Brazil and Spain.

=== Honors and awards ===
In 1983 he won the Prêmio UNICAMP de Incentivo à Pesquisa (UNICAMP Prize for Incentive in Research) from the Conselho Nacional de Desenvolvimento Científico e Tecnológico. In 1998 he was given UNICAMP's Prêmio Zeferino Vaz.

He was awarded the Grã-Cruz da Ordem Nacional do Mérito Científico (Grand Cross of the National Order of Scientific Merit), presented by the President of the Federative Republic of Brazil, in 2000.

In 2004 he won the Prêmio de Ciência e Cultura (Prize in Science and Culture) from the Fundação Conrad Wessel, and the Prêmio Personalidades da Tecnologia from the Sindicato dos Engenheiros do Estado de São Paulo (São Paulo Engineers' Union).

In 2011 he was elected a fellow of the Academy of Sciences for the Developing World.

=== Selected publications ===
Brito Cruz has written, alone or in collaboration, over 100 scientific papers and conference presentations. He has supervised eleven doctoral dissertations (two in co-supervision) and ten masters' theses (one as co-supervisor).

- MIRANDA, R. S., JACOBOVITZ, G. R., BRITO CRUZ, C. H. and SCARPARO, M. 1986 . Positive and negative chirping of laser pulses shorter than 100 fsec. in a saturable absorber. Optics Letters. vol. 11, p. 224.
- FORK, R. L., BRITO CRUZ, C. H., BECKER, P. C. and SHANK, C. V. 1987 . Compression of optical pulses to six femtosecond by using cubic phase compensation. Optics Letters. vol. 12, p. 483.
- BRITO CRUZ, C. H., GORDON, J. P., BECKER, P. C., FORK, R. L. and SHANK, C. V. 1988. Dynamics of spectral hole burning. IEEE Journal of Quantum Electronics. vol. QE-24, p. 261.
- MATHIES, R. A., BRITO CRUZ, C. H., POLLARD, W. T. and SHANK, C. V. 1988 . Direct observation of the femtosecond excited state cis-trans isomerization in bacterio rhodopsin. Science. vol. 240, p. 777.
- DE OLIVEIRA, C. R. M., DE PAULA, A. M., PLENTZ FILHO, F. O., MEDEIROS NETO, J. A., BARBOSA, L. C., ALVES, O. L., MENEZES, E. A., RIOS, J. M. M., FRAGNITO, H. L., BRITO CRUZ, C. H. and CESAR, C. L. 1995 . Probing of the quantum dot size distribution in CdTe doped-glasses by photoluminescence excitation spectroscopy. Applied of Physics Letters. vol. 66, p. 439 – 441.
- TSUDA, S. and BRITO CRUZ, C. H. 1996 . Femtosecond dynamics of the AC Stark effect in semiconductor doped glass. Applied of Physics Letters. vol. 68, p. 1093 – 1095.

In addition to his scientific papers, Brito Cruz has written a great many articles for the general public, about such subjects as the need for improvements in Brazilian higher education and the importance of research-and-development relations between businesses and universities. These articles have appeared in O Estado de S. Paulo, Folha de S.Paulo, Correio Popular, and other newspapers and magazines.

== Personal life ==
In addition to Portuguese, Brito Cruz is fluent in English and Italian, and also has some fluency in French and Spanish.
