= Herculano =

Herculano is both a surname and given name. Notable people with the name include:

- Alexandre Herculano (1810–1877), Portuguese novelist and historian
- Suzana Herculano-Houzel (born 1972), Brazilian neuroscientist
- Herculano Ferreira Pena (1800–1867), Brazilian politician
