= Wanderson Romão =

Brazilian chemist

Wanderson Romão is a Brazilian chemist, who is active in the fields of analytical chemistry and forensic science. He is a professor of the Instituto Federal do Espírito Santo (Ifes).

== Awards ==
- Prize for the best article in forensic sciences - Brazilian Society of Forensic Sciences (2016).

== Literature ==
- Patrícia Scalzer: Criança embarca em voo para Vitória, mas acaba, por engano, em Curitiba // Globo Comunicação e Participações, 3 December 2016.
- UFES cria técnica para identificar com mais eficácia arma usada em crime // JORNAL NACIONAL, 13 May 2014.

== Web-sources ==
- "Wanderson Romão". CDi/FAPESP - Documentation and Information Center, São Paulo Research Foundation.
