= 2590 Mourão =

Main-belt asteroid

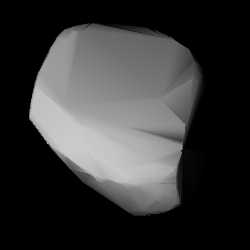
- Shape model of Mourão from its lightcurve

Discovery
- Discovered by: H. Debehogne
- Discovery site: La Silla Obs.
- Discovery date: 22 May 1980

Designations
- Named after: Ronaldo Mourão (Brazilian astronomer)
- Alternative designations: 1980 KJ · 1949 WP; 1963 SM · 1974 UN; 1974 VG_{2} · 1974 XK
- Minor planet category: main-belt · (inner); Vesta · Flora

Orbital characteristics
- Epoch 23 March 2018 (JD 2458200.5)
- Uncertainty parameter 0
- Observation arc: 68.36 yr (24,967 d)
- Aphelion: 2.6200 AU
- Perihelion: 2.0648 AU
- Semi-major axis: 2.3424 AU
- Eccentricity: 0.1185
- Orbital period (sidereal): 3.59 yr (1,309 d)
- Mean anomaly: 50.740°
- Mean motion: 0° 16^{m} 29.64^{s} / day
- Inclination: 6.1361°
- Longitude of ascending node: 223.68°
- Argument of perihelion: 165.80°

Physical characteristics
- Mean diameter: 6.96 km (calculated); 7.880±1.058 km
- Synodic rotation period: 15.59±0.01 h
- Geometric albedo: 0.40 (assumed); 0.605±0.296
- Spectral type: V
- Absolute magnitude (H): 11.68; 12.4

2590 Mourão (prov. designation: 1980 kJ) is a bright Vesta asteroid from the inner regions of the asteroid belt, approximately 7 kilometers (4.3 miles) in diameter. It was discovered on 22 May 1980, by Belgian astronomer Henri Debehogne at ESO's La Silla Observatory in northern Chile. The V-type asteroid has a rotation period of 15.6 hours. It was named after Brazilian astronomer Ronaldo Rogério de Freitas Mourão.

== Orbit and classification ==
Mourão is a core member of the Vesta family. Vestian asteroids have a composition akin to cumulate eucrite (HED meteorites) and are thought to have originated deep within 4 Vesta's crust, possibly from the Rheasilvia crater, a large impact crater on its southern hemisphere near the South pole, formed as a result of a subcatastrophic collision. I has also been classified as a member of the Flora family (Zappala; double classification by Nesvorny), one of the largest asteroid clans in the main-belt. It orbits the Sun in the inner asteroid belt at a distance of 2.1–2.6 AU once every 3 years and 7 months (1,309 days; semi-major axis of 2.34 AU). Its orbit has an eccentricity of 0.12 and an inclination of 6° with respect to the ecliptic. The asteroid was first observed as 1949 WP at Uccle Observatory in November 1949. The body's observation arc begins with at precovery taken at Purple Mountain Observatory in October 1973, almost seven years prior to its official discovery observation at La Silla.

== Naming ==
This minor planet was named in honor of Brazilian astronomer Ronaldo Rogério de Freitas Mourão (1935–2014) at the National Observatory of Brazil, in Rio de Janeiro. His activities included the study of double stars, minor planets and comets. He participated extensively in ESO's discoverer program of observations of minor planets. Mourão also wrote several astronomical books and was the founder of the Brazilian Museum for Astronomy (Portuguese: Museu de Astronomia e Ciências Afins). The official naming citation was published by the Minor Planet Center on 2 July 1985 (M.P.C. 9767).

== Physical characteristics ==
Mourão has been characterized as a bright V-type asteroid. V-type asteroids are less common than the abundant S-type asteroids but similar in composition, except for their higher concentration of pyroxenes, an aluminium-rich silicate mineral.

=== Albedo ===
According to the survey carried out by the WISE and subsequent NEOWISE mission, the body's albedo amounts to 0.61, while the Collaborative Asteroid Lightcurve Link assumes a somewhat less extraordinary value of 0.4.

=== Lightcurves ===
Photometric observations of this asteroid by Slovak astronomer Adrián Galád in September 2006, gave a rotational lightcurve with a rotation period of 15.59±0.01 hours and a brightness variation of 0.49 magnitude (U=3). A second, less secure lightcurve was obtained by Italian astronomers Roberto Crippa and Federico Manzini in September 2013, which gave a divergent period of 35.52 hours with an amplitude of 0.46 magnitude (U=2).
