= Sceloporus druckercolini =

Scientific classification
- Kingdom: Animalia
- Phylum: Chordata
- Class: Reptilia
- Order: Squamata
- Suborder: Iguania
- Family: Phrynosomatidae
- Genus: Sceloporus
- Species: S. druckercolini

Binomial name
- Sceloporus druckercolini Pérez-Ramos & Saldaña-de La Riva, 2008

Species of lizard

Sceloporus druckercolini, also known commonly as the graceful mountain tree lizard and lagartija elegante arborícola de montaña in Mexican Spanish, is a species of lizard in the family Phrynosomatidae. The species is endemic to Mexico.

== Etymology ==
The specific name, druckercolini, is in honor of Mexican scientist René Raúl Drucker-Colín.

== Geographic range ==
S. druckercolini is found in southern Mexico, in the Mexican state of Guerrero.

== Habitat ==
The preferred natural habitat of S. druckercolini is pine-oak forest, at an altitude of 2,170 m (7,120 ft).

== Reproduction ==
The mode of reproduction of S. druckercolini is unknown.
