= Doug Smith (Canadian football) =

Canadian football player (born 1952)

Profile
- Position: Centre

Personal information
- Born: June 16, 1952 (age 74); Galt, Ontario, Canada
- Listed height: 6 ft 1 in (1.85 m)
- Listed weight: 235 lb (107 kg)

Career information
- High school: Glenview Secondary (Cambridge, Ontario)
- College: Wilfrid Laurier University
- CFL draft: 1974: 4th round, 34th overall pick

Career history
- 1974–1980: Montreal Alouettes
- 1981–1982: Toronto Argonauts
- 1983–1984: Montreal Concordes

Awards and highlights
- 2× Grey Cup champion (1974, 1977); CFL All-Star (1979)

Doug Smith (born June 16, 1952) is a Canadian former professional football offensive lineman who played 11 seasons in the Canadian Football League for two different teams. He was a part of a Grey Cup championship team with the Montreal Alouettes in 1974. Smith played college football at Wilfrid Laurier University.

Doug started playing football in High School in Galt (Cambridge) Ontario when he was in grade 9. He never played in one winning game until his year in Grade 13 when his team won the district championship. He was selected as his high schools top graduating male athlete as much for hockey as football; he was a goalie.

Doug was offered scholarships to several universities for both hockey and football. Doug chose to go to Wilfrid Laurier University in Waterloo Ontario where he was on both the varsity football and hockey team. In 3 years there, Wilfrid Laurier won 2 Ontario championships, one Eastern Canada Championship and was a Canadian National finalists. Doug played left guard and was named to the All-Canadian team during his graduating year. He graduated with a B.A. in geography. In 1988, he was inducted into their Golden Hawk Hall of Fame, and was named in their team of the century in 2011.

Doug Smith was chosen by the Montreal Alouettes in the 4th round of the 1974 CFL Canadian College Draft. He played offensive center for the Alouettes from 1974 to 1980 and then for the Toronto Argonauts in 1981 and 1982 and was traded back to Montreal for 1983 and 84. In eleven years in the CFL, he was fortunate to have played on some great teams and went to the Grey Cup 6 times winning it twice. In 1979 he was chosen to the Eastern All-Star team. Throughout his career he wore sweater #53. His only jersey is now in the Cambridge Sports Hall of Fame where he was inducted in 2002.
