= Amilcar Tanuri =

Brazilian epidemiologist (1958–2025)

- Born: 4 September 1958; Rio de Janeiro, Brazil
- Died: 26 September 2025 (aged 67); Rio de Janeiro, Brazil
- Education: Federal University of Rio de Janeiro
- Occupation: Epidemiologist

Amilcar Tanuri (4 September 1958 – 26 September 2025) was a Brazilian epidemiologist. A member of the Brazilian Academy of Sciences, he was a recipient of the National Order of Scientific Merit (2018).

Tanuri died in Rio de Janeiro on 26 September 2025, at the age of 67.
