= Ennio Candotti =

Brazilian scientist (1942–2023)

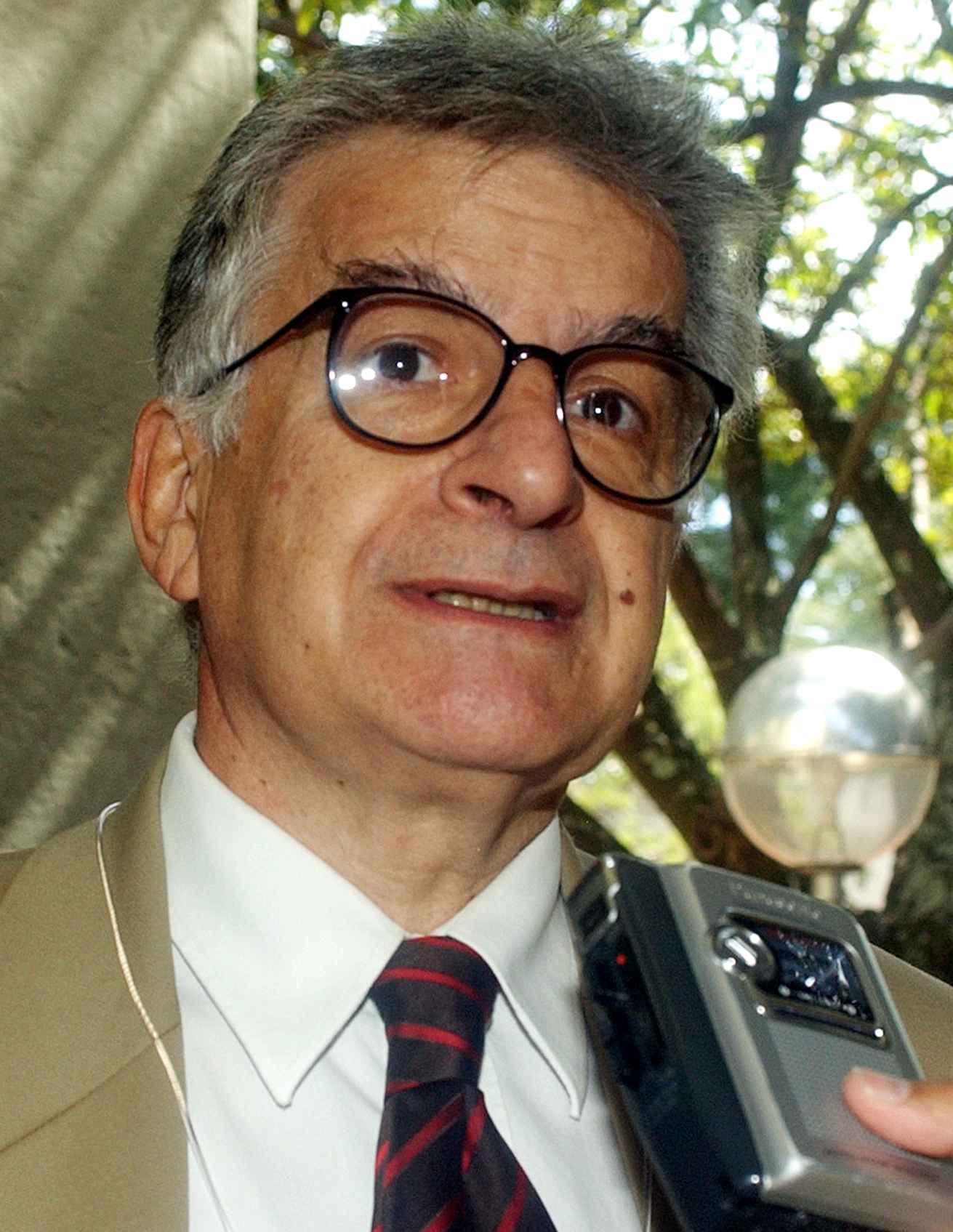
- Born: 12 February 1942; Rome, Italy
- Died: 6 December 2023 (aged 81); Manaus, Amazonas, Brazil
- Education: University of São Paulo (B.Sc.); University of Naples (Ph.D.)
- Known for: Contributions to theoretical physics
- Awards: Kalinga Prize (1999)
- Scientific career
- Fields: Physics
- Workplaces: Federal University of Rio de Janeiro, Universidade Federal do Espírito Santo

Ennio Candotti (12 February 1942 – 6 December 2023) was a Brazilian physicist and scientific leader.

== Biography ==
Born in Rome, Italy, he studied physics at the University of São Paulo from 1960 to 1964, and also at the University of Naples from 1970 to 1971. From 1966 to 1968, he specialized in theoretical physics at the University of Pisa (relativity theory), in mathematical physics at LMU Munich from 1968 to 1969, and in dynamic systems at the University of Naples again.

From 1974 to 1995, Candotti was a professor with the Federal University of Rio de Janeiro. He was a professor at the Universidade Federal do Espírito Santo, in Vitória, state of Espírito Santo. He was naturalized as a Brazilian in 1983.

Candotti was four times president of the Brazilian Society for the Progress of Science (Sociedade Brasileira para o Progresso da Ciência), the major scientific association in the country, and editor of Ciência Hoje, its scientific popularization magazine. For his activities in this area, he has received the 1999 Kalinga Prize conceded by UNESCO. He was also the president of the International Union for Science Communicators, created in 2002 in Mumbai, India. He was also director-general of the Museum of the Amazon (Musa).

Candotti died in Manaus on 6 December 2023, at the age of 81.

== Bibliography ==
1. Candotti, E.; COCHO, G.; MONTEMAYOR, R. Thermal Gohost fields and unstable systems. Nuovo Cimento Della Societa Italiana di Fisica B - General Physics, Bologna, v. 106B, p. 13–22, 1990.
2. Candotti, E.; Palmieri, C.; Vitale, B. Universal Noether's nature of infinitesimal transformations in Lorentz covariant field theories. Il Nuovo Cimento, Bologna, v. 7A, p. 271–279, 1972.
3. Candotti, E.; Palmieri, C.; Vitale, B. On the inversion of Noether theorem in classical dynamical systems. American Journal of Physics, USA, v. 40.3, p. 424–427, 1972.
4. Candotti, E.; Palmieri, C.; Vitale, B. On the inversion of Noether Theorem in Lagrangian Formalism. Il Nuovo Cimento, Bologna, v. 70, p. 233–239, 1970.
