= Ricardo Renzo Brentani =

Brazilian scientist (1937–2011)

Ricardo Renzo Brentani (21 July 1937 – 29 November 2011) was a noted Brazilian physician, scientist and university professor. He was made a Grand Cross of the Brazilian Order of Scientific Merit in 2007. He graduated in medicine at the Faculty of Medicine, University of São Paulo. After completing his doctoral studies in biochemistry and developing his entire teaching and research career there, Brentani became a full professor and dean.

In January 1983, Brentani became the founding director of the São Paulo Branch of the global Ludwig Institute for Cancer Research (LICR). Brentani retired from this position on December 31, 2005, having there guided the training and research of many hundreds of students.

Brentani also became president of the São Paulo Cancer Hospital, where he directs its research center. He is one of the outstanding Brazilian scientific leaders, and is the director of the Technical and Administrative Council of the São Paulo State Research Foundation.

Brentani died from a heart attack on 29 November 2011.
