= João Lucas Marques Barbosa =

Brazilian physicist, researcher, and university professor

- Born: April 9, 1943 (age 83); Fortaleza, Ceará, Brazil
- Education: Federal University of Ceará (bachelor's and master's degrees); University of California, Berkeley (doctoral degree)
- Awards: Commander of the National Order of Scientific Merit (1995); Grand Officer of the National Order of Scientific Merit (2004)
- Scientific career
- Fields: Mathematics
- Thesis: On Minimal Immersions of S^{2} Into S^{2m} (1985)
- Doctoral advisor: Shiing-Shen Chern

João Lucas Marques Barbosa (born April 9, 1943) is a Brazilian physicist, researcher, and university professor.

Commander and Grand Officer of the National Order of Scientific Merit (Ordem Nacional do Mérito Científico) and member of the Brazilian Academy of Sciences (Academia Brasileira de Ciências - ABC), João Lucas is professor emeritus of the Department of Mathematics of the Federal University of Ceará (UFC), and author of several books on mathematics. He is a member of the Science and Technology Council of the Ceará state government.

== Biography ==
Barbosa was born in Fortaleza in 1943. Coming from a poor family, he lost his father, a grain merchant at the Central Market of Fortaleza, in 1946, when he was only 3 years old. His mother was an elementary school teacher and principal, from the age of 17 until 70. João Lucas was taught literacy at home, and studied his early years at the Domingos Brasileiro Reunited Schools, then at the Castelo Branco School, and, finally, at the Ceará's liceu, in an evening course, where he completed the scientific course.

In high school he studied at night because he had entered the Banking Apprenticeship Course, created by the Bank of Northeast (Banco do Nordeste do Brasil - BNB) with the objective of training professionals for a career in banking. Upon graduating, he became an employee of the bank. The university course only came in 1962, when he entered the Federal University of Ceará (UFC), in the first class of the bachelor's degree in Mathematics of the then recently created Faculty of Philosophy, Sciences and Letters. He passed in first place in the entrance exam of the course.

In his first year he had classes with the mathematician Elon Lages Lima, from whom he learned calculus, and, in the third year, with Manfredo do Carmo, learning differential geometry, an area in which he became interested almost immediately. He received a scholarship for scientific initiation in his first year, which made him leave the Bank of Northeast. He managed to keep his scholarship until the second semester of 1964, but ended up losing it, as well as his job at the bank. So he started teaching in prep courses and colleges in order to earn money.

He was a student leader, academic directory president, member of the direction team of the Catholic University Youth and even candidate for president of the Central Students Directory (Diretório Central dos Estudantes - DCE). He got his bachelor's degree in December 1965 and, through a public contest, he joined the UFC as a teaching assistant. At the same time, he began his master's degree in mathematics, defending his dissertation in July 1967.

== Career ==
Already married in 1969, he received a scholarship from CNPq and left for his doctorate at the University of California, Berkeley, at the time the best center for the study of differential geometry. His thesis, defended in 1972 under the guidance of Shiing-Shen Chern, was on minimal immersions, a trendy subject at that time.

Back in Brazil, he taught mathematics at UFC and in elementary and medical schools in the capital city of Ceará. He served as a graduate course coordinator and, lastly, as President of the Ceará Foundation for Research Support. He is the author of several books on Euclidean plane geometry and hyperbolic geometry. His line of research focuses on immersions with prescribed r-curvature and stability issues.

== See also ==
- National Order of Scientific Merit
- Brazilian Academy of Sciences (ABC)
- Federal University of Ceará (UFC)
