= Simon Schwartzman =

Brazilian social scientist

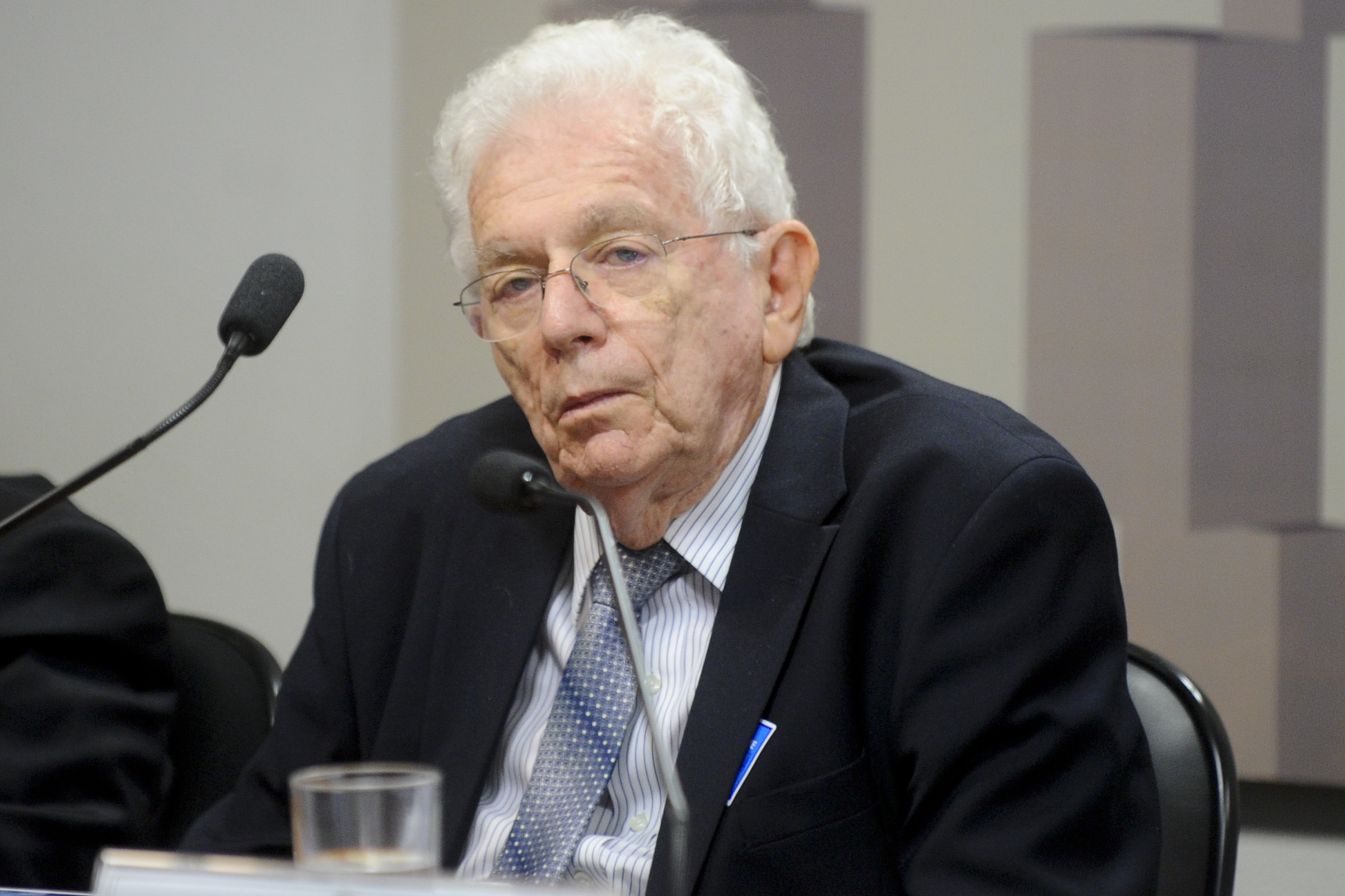
Simon Schwartzman

Simon Schwartzman (born July 3, 1939 in Belo Horizonte, Brazil) is a Brazilian social scientist. He has published extensively, with many books, book chapters and academic articles in the areas of comparative politics, sociology of science, social policy, and education, with emphasis on Brazil and Latin America. He was the President of the Brazilian Association of Sociology in 1990–91, and President of the Brazilian Institute for Geography and Statistics (IBGE) from 1994 to 1998. He is a retired professor from the Federal University of Minas Gerais and has taught at the University of São Paulo. He is a member of the Brazilian Academy of Sciences, holder of the Grand Cross of the Brazilian Order of Scientific Merit (1996), and officer of the National Order of Education Merit (2018). He is currently an associate researcher at the Institute for Studies in Economic Policy (Instituto de Estudos de Política Econômica / Casa das Garças) in Rio de Janeiro.

== Education ==
Schwartzman received his BA in Sociology, Political Science and Public Administration from the Federal University of Minas Gerais. He received an MA in sociology from the Facultad Latinoamericana de Ciencias Sociales (FLACSO) in Santiago, Chile. He achieved his Ph.D. in political science at the University of California, Berkeley.

== Biography ==
He was born in Belo Horizonte, Brazil, son of Jewish parents who migrated to Brazil from Poland and Bessarabia in the 1920s. He studied sociology, political science, and public administration at the School of Economics of the Federal University of Minas Gerais, Brazil (1958–61), and worked for his master's degree at the Latin American School of Social Sciences (FLACSO) in Santiago, Chile (1962–63). In early 1964 he returned to the University of Minas Gerais as a faculty member, but after the military coup of 1964, he was arrested, prosecuted on political grounds, and the University was ordered not to allow him to return to work. In late 1965 he left Brazil to work as a fellow of the International Peace Research Institute in Oslo, Norway, invited by Johan Galtung. In 1966 he went to work at the Fundación Bariloche in Argentina, and in 1967–68 he studied political science at the [[University of California, Berkeley]]. He returned to Brazil in 1969, settling in Rio de Janeiro, where he worked at the Getúlio Vargas Foundation (EBAP) and at the University Research Institute, Candido Mendes University. Between 1976 and 1979 he worked at the Financiadora de Estudos e Projetos|Brazilian Financing Agency for Studies and Projects (FINEP), and between 1989 and 1994 at the University of São Paulo, as professor of political science and academic coordinator of the Research Group on Higher Education (NUPES). In the Spring of 1988, Schwartzman was a Fellow at the Swedish Collegium for Advanced Study in Uppsala, Sweden. He served as President of the Brazilian Institute for Geography and Statistics (IBGE) between 1994 and 1998. After leaving IBGE, he joined the American Institutes for Research (AIR) as its director for Brazil, and later the Institute for Studies on Labor and Society (IETS). He is currently an associate researcher at the Institute for Studies in Economic Policy (Casa das Garças) in Rio de Janeiro. His memoir was published in 2021 as Falso mineiro: memórias da política, ciência, educação e Sociedade.

== Academic contributions ==
=== Political Science and social policy ===
His doctoral dissertation, Regional cleavages and political patrimonialism in Brazil, dealt with the issues of social development and authoritarianism in Brazil in a comparative perspective, looking at the historical roots and current implications of political patrimonialism and authoritarianism. The work was published in Brazil in several editions as São Paulo e o Estado Nacional and later as Bases do Autoritarismo Brasileiro (Foundations of Authoritarianism in Brazil). The book is considered a reference in the literature on the characteristics of Brazil's political system. In 2004 he published a book on poverty and social exclusion, and in 2011 he co-edited a book on The New Social Agenda for Brazil. He was also engaged in a comparative study on development and democracy in India, South Africa and Brazil.

=== Science, Technology and Society ===
In the 1970s he joined the research group of the Brazilian Financing Agency for Studies and Projects (FINEP), where he coordinated a major study on the origins and development of the Brazilian scientific community. The book was published in English as A Space for Science – The Development of the Scientific Community in Brazil and had three Brazilian editions. The book became a main reference for research on the history of science and society in Brazil and Latin America. In 1994 he was one of the co-authors of The New Production of Knowledge, a book which created a major debate by arguing that contemporary science and technology was shifting towards a different institutional arrangement called 'mode 2'. In 1993–94 he coordinated the preparation of a major policy study for the Brazilian science and technology sector. The outcomes of this work were published in three volumes by the Getúlio Vargas Foundation in Brazil, in English and Portuguese. In 2006–07 he coordinated a project with results published as University and Development in Latin America: Successful Experiences of Research Centers, covering Argentina, Brazil, Chile and Mexico.

=== Education policies ===
In the 1980s he worked at the Center for Contemporary History of the Getúlio Vargas Foundation in Brazil, conducting research on the establishment of Brazil's education institutions in the 1930s, published as Tempos de Capanema. In 1989–94 he participated in a comparative study on higher education policies in Latin America, published as Latin America: Universities in Transition in 1996. In 2001 he organized a Delphi survey on the future of education in Latin America, at the request of the UNESCO Office for Education in Latin America (OREALC), Santiago, Chile. In 2005, with Colin Brock, he co-edited The Challenges of Education in Brazil, published in English and Portuguese. In 2009 he co-edited a volume on Education Policies and Social Cohesion in Latin America. He has also published an edited book on higher education in the BRICS countries and another on education in South American countries, as well as papers on secondary and vocational education in Brazil.

== Collected texts of Simon Schwartzman ==
Collected texts of Simon Schwartzman is a digital collection of Schwartzman's books at the Internet Archive. This collection contains over 900 titles.

== Select bibliography ==
Where the book exists in multilingual editions, English information is given first.

- Schwartzman, S. "Falso Mineiro: "Memórias da Política, Ciência, Educação e Sociedade". Rio de Janeiro, Intrínseca / História Real, 2021.
- Schwartzman, S. and Edmar Bacha, José Murilo de Carvalho, Joaquim Falcão, Marcelo Trindade e Pedro Malan, "130 Anos: Em Busca da República. Rio de Janeiro, Editora Intrínseca, 2019.
- Schwartzman, S. "Educação média profissional no Brasil: situação e caminhos". São Paulo: Fundação Santillana, 2016.
- Schwartzman, S. (editor), "Higher Education in Latin America and the challenges of the 21st century", Springer / Editora da Unicamp, 2020.
- Schwartzman, S. "A Educação Superior na América Latina e os Desafios do Século XXI", Editora Unicamp, 2015.
- Schwartzman, S. and Rómulo Pinheiro, and Pundy Pillay. "Higher Education in the BRICS Countries - Investigating the Pact between Higher Education and Society. Dordrecht: Springer, 2015.
- Schwartzman, S. "A Via Democrática - Como o desenvolvimento econômico e social ocorre no Brasil". Rio de Janeiro, Campus - Elsevier.
- Schwartzman, S. and C.M. Castro. Reforma da Educação Superior: uma visão crítica. Brasília: Funadesp, 2005.
- Schwartzman, S. and Micheline Christophe. A sociedade do conhecimento e a educação tecnológica. Brasília: Senai - Departamento Nacional, 2005.
- Schwartzman, S. and C. Brock, editors. The Challenges of Education in Brazil. Oxford: Symposium Books, 2004. (Brazilian edition: Os desafios da educação no Brasil. Rio de Janeiro: Nova. Fronteira, 2005.)
- Schwartzman, S. Pobreza, exclusão social e modernidade: uma introdução ao mundo contemporâneo. São Paulo: Augurium Editora, 2004.
- Schwartzman, S. As Causas da Pobreza. Rio de Janeiro: Editora FGV, 2004.
- Schwartzman, S. and J.B.A.E. Oliveira. A Escola Vista por Dentro. Belo Horizonte: Alfa Educativa Editora, 2002.
- Schwartzman, S. Trabalho Infantil no Brasil. Brasília: Organização Internacional do Trabalho, 2001.
- Schwartzman, S.The Future of Education in Latin America and the Caribbean. Santiago: UNESCO, 2001.
- Schwartzman, S. A Space for Science: The Development of the Scientific Community in Brazil. Pittsburgh: The Pennsylvania State University Press, 1991. (Brazilian 2nd edition: Um Espaço para a Ciência - a formação da comunidade científica no Brasil. Brasília: Ministério de Ciência e Tecnologia, Centro de Estudos Estratégicos, 2001. 1st edition published in 1979.)
- Schwartzman, S., H.M.B. Bomeny, and V.M.R. Costa. Tempos de Capanema. 2. ed. São Paulo e Rio de Janeiro: Editora Paz e Terra e Fundação Getúlio Vargas, 2000. (1st edition published in 1994.)
- Schwartzman, S. A Redescoberta da Cultura. São Paulo: Editora da Universidade de São Paulo, 1997.
- Schwartzman, S. America Latina universidades en transición. Washington, DC: Organização dos Estados Americanos, 1996.
- Schwartzman, S., E. Krieger, C.O. Bertero, and F. Galembeck, editors. Science and Technology in Brazil: a New Policy for a Global World. Rio de Janeiro: Editora da Fundação Getúlio Vargas, 1995. (Brazilian: Ciência e tecnologia no Brasil: uma nova política para um mundo global. Vol 2:. política industrial, mercado de trabalho e instituições de apoio. Rio de Janeiro: Editora da Fundação Getúlio Vargas, 1995.) 3 volumes.
- Schwartzman, S. Bases do Autoritarismo Brasileiro. Rio de Janeiro: Editora Campus, 1982.
- Schwartzman, S. Ciência, Universidade e Ideologia: A Política do Conhecimento. Rio de Janeiro: Zahar Editores, 1980.
- Schwartzman, S. São Paulo e o Estado Nacional. São Paulo: Difusão Européia do Livro, 1975.
