= Ethevaldo Mello de Siqueira =

Brazilian writer (1932–2022)

Ethevaldo Siqueira
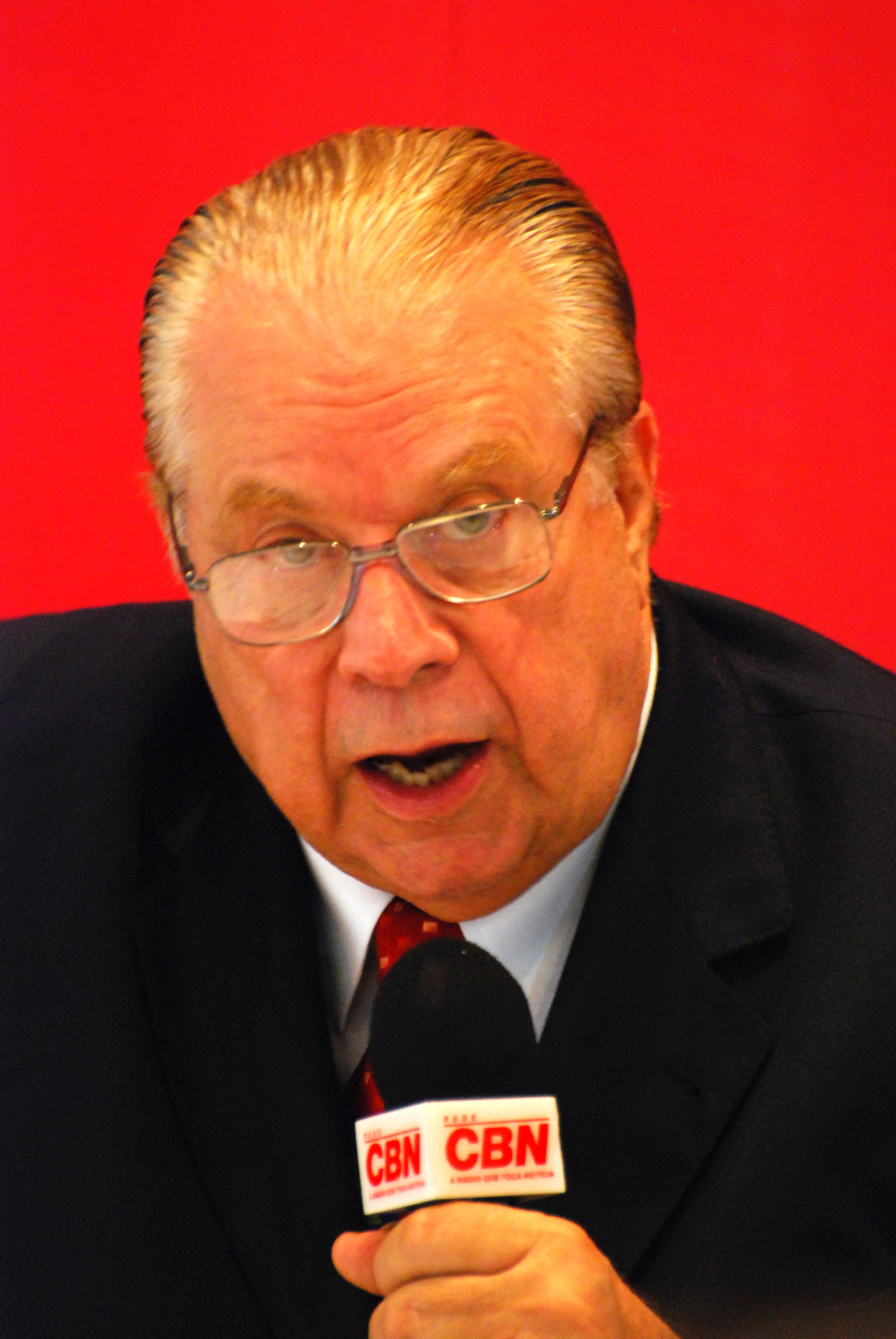
- Born: 1 August 1932; Monte Alto, Brazil
- Died: 17 October 2022 (aged 90); São Paulo, Brazil

Ethevaldo Mello de Siqueira (nom de plume Ethevaldo Siqueira; 1 August 1932 – 17 October 2022) was a Brazilian journalist, science writer, consultant and publisher, specializing in new technologies. He wrote a weekly column on the subject for the O Estado de S. Paulo newspaper. Since 1967, he was a collaborator of Veja magazine and a commentator on Rádio CBN, from 2006, with a daily column called Digital World.

Siqueira was born in Monte Alegre on 1 August 1932.

Siqueira was a professor of information technology and telematics on the journalism course at the Escola de Comunicações e Artes da Universidade de São Paulo (ECA - School of Communications and Arts) of the University of São Paulo from 1986 to 1996. He founded and directed the Revista Nacional de Telecomunicações (RNT), from 1979 to 2001, and the magazine TelePress Latinoamérica, from 1991 to 2001.

Siqueira died from leukemia in São Paulo on 17 October 2022, at the age of 90.

== Professional prizes and awards ==
Siqueira received many awards and honors, including the José Reis Award of Scientific Divulgation (1985), the Telesp Award on Telecommunications (1979), the Prize of the Ministry of Telecommunications (1974), the SUCESU Prize for Informatics Journalism (1971) and two versions of the Esso Prize of Journalism in Scientific and Technological Information (1969).

== Bibliography ==
- Tecnologias Que Mudam Nossas Vidas (2007)
- 2015 - Como Viveremos - o Futuro na Visão (2006)
- Brasil, 500 Anos de Telecomunicação e A Eterna Busca da Liberdade (2001)
- A Sociedade Inteligente (1987)
- Grandes Personagens das Comunicações (2001)
