= Emil Gabrielian =

Armenian physician (1931–2010)

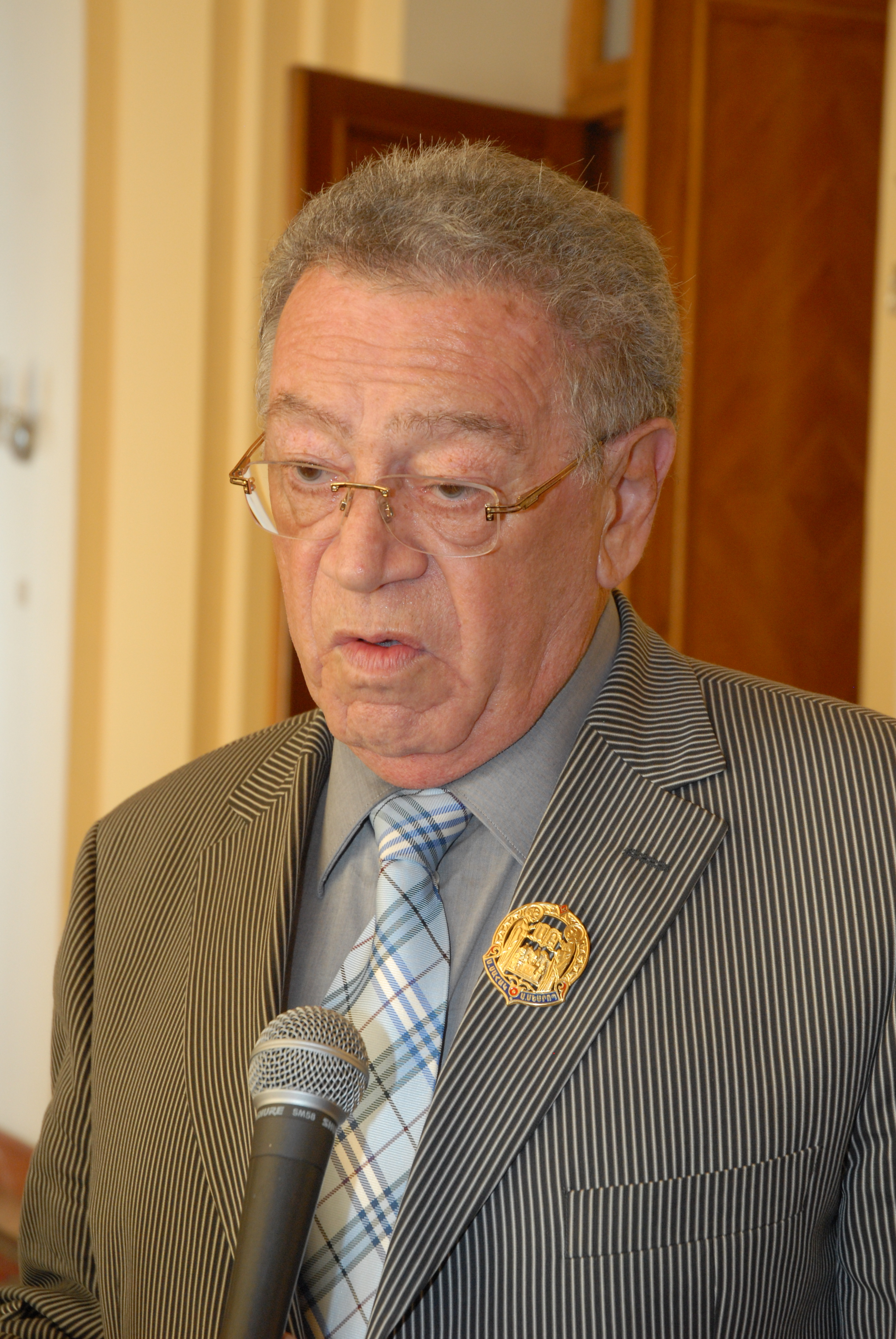

Minister of Health of Armenian SSR
- In office 1975–1989

Personal details
- Born: Emil Samsonovich Gabrielian; January 31, 1931 Ashtarak, Aragatsotn Province, Armenia
- Died: July 20, 2010 (aged 79) United States
- Profession: Physician and academician
- Awards: UNESCO Kalinga Prize (1999)
- Work Institutions: Yerevan State Medical Institute

Emil Samsonovich Gabrielian (Armenian: Էմիլ Սամսոնի Գաբրիելյան; January 31, 1931 – July 20, 2010) was an Armenian physician and academician. From 1971 to 1975, he served as the Rector of Yerevan State Medical Institute, and from 1975 to 1989, he was the Minister of Health of Armenia.

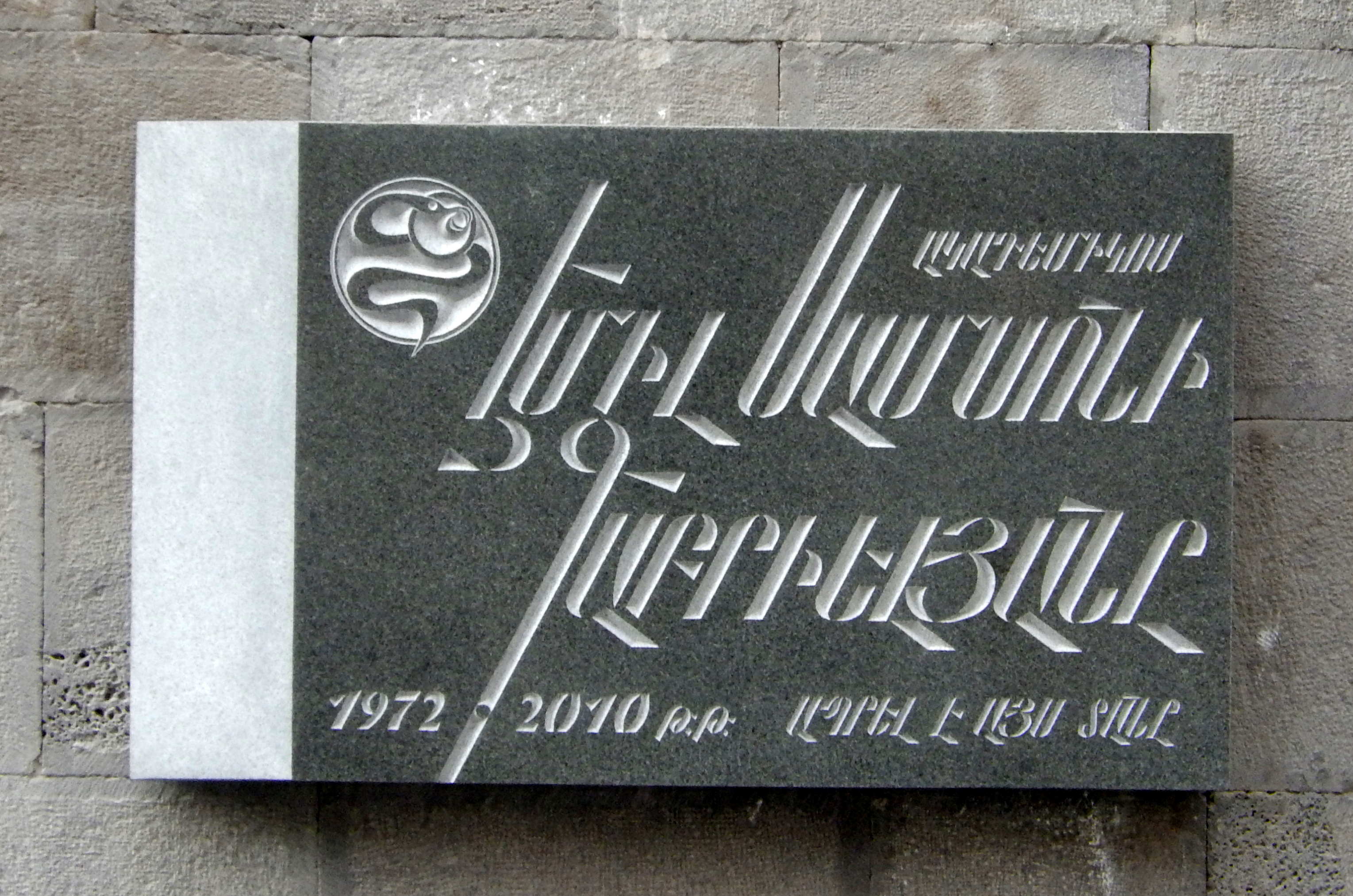

During his tenure as Minister, he developed a more egalitarian form of healthcare for the population and implemented an entire infrastructure for medicine throughout the country, including the construction of various hospitals, health clinics, and the like.

After the devastating earthquake in Armenia in 1988, Professor Gabrielian distinguished himself for his efforts to mitigate the trauma endured by the Armenian population, including the setting up of a transnational system of telemedicine with the support of NASA to treat earthquake victims.

In recognition of his contribution to the development of science and medicine in Armenia, and of his efforts to ensure that all Armenians benefit from advances in medicine, Professor Gabrielian was elected to the National Academy of Sciences (1994) and appointed to the Board of the National Foundation of Science and Advanced Technologies of Armenia, among other distinctions.

In 1992, Professor Gabrielian founded the Scientific Centre of Drug and Medical Technology of Armenia as a way to implement a national drug policy and to ensure the safety, efficacy and quality of medicinal products in Armenia. He served as the director of the Center until his death in 2010.

In 1999, Professor Gabrielian received the UNESCO Kalinga Prize for the Popularization of Science.
