= Alfred Maddock =

British chemist

Alfred Gavin Maddock
- Born: 15 August 1917; Bedford Park, London
- Died: 5 April 2009 (aged 91)
- Education: Imperial College, London
- Scientific career
- Fields: Inorganic chemistry, radiochemistry, spectroscopy
- Thesis: (1942)
- Doctoral advisor: H. J. Emeléus

Alfred Gavin Maddock (1917–2009) was an English inorganic chemist, radiochemist and spectroscopist who worked on the Tube Alloys Project and the Manhattan Project during World War II. Those projects resulted in the development of the atomic bomb. He may be best known for, during World War II, spilling Canada's entire supply of plutonium which was 10 milligrams onto a wooden laboratory bench, and for recovered 9 and a half milligrams of plutonium. He recovered it by wet chemistry. He also had a distinguished, though less eventful, post-war academic career.

== Biography ==
Maddock was born in Bedford Park, a garden suburb of London, and was educated at Latymer Upper School. He won a state scholarship to study chemistry at the Royal College of Science (RCS), then a constituent part of Imperial College London. After his undergraduate education, he continued on to postgraduate studies at RCS under the supervision of inorganic chemist Professor H. J. Emeléus. Those studies related to silicon hydrides, and he was awarded his PhD in 1942.

During the early years of World War II, his other studies included methods of protection against arsine, which had been proposed as a chemical warfare agent. He also studied the toxicity of volatile compounds of fluorine; which resulted in his suffering an acute case of poisoning. He and Lord Rothschild devised a device based on mercuric chloride which was used by Allied parachutists into France. (Note: The source is silent as to the nature of that device. There may be a grim reason for that silence. The best-known characteristic of mercuric chloride is that it is a swift-acting poison. Some captured SOE parachutists may have been glad that they had been equipped with a speedy means of release.)

In 1941, he got to know several French nuclear physicists from the Curie Institute in Paris who had escaped the Nazi invasion. He initially worked with them at the Cavendish Laboratory in Cambridge, and later moved with them and others to Ottawa, Canada, where he helped build a heavy water reactor, as part of what was first known as the Tube Alloys Project and later as the Manhattan Project. It was during that time that he spilled Canada's supply of plutonium (about 10 mg) onto a wooden laboratory bench. He pragmatically sawed it into pieces, ashed them, and recovered the plutonium by wet chemistry.

After the War, he returned to England; was appointed lecturer in the Department of Chemistry at the University of Cambridge, where Emeléus now occupied the chair of inorganic chemistry; and was elected Fellow of St Catharine's College.

He had a broad range of scientific interests, which included: the chemistry of the actinide elements, in particular plutonium and protactinium; the chemistry associated with nuclear transformation; solvent extraction; radiation of inorganic solids; the chemistry of positronium ions; and Mössbauer spectroscopy, in which he was a pioneer. He was consultant to the International Atomic Energy Agency, and to atomic energy projects in various countries. He published more than 300 scientific papers.

== Honours and awards ==
These include:

- 1960 – Awarded DSc and a personal readership by the University of Cambridge
- Awarded DSc honoris causa by the University of Louvain, Belgium
- Elected to the Brazilian Academy of Sciences; in 1995, awarded by it its Grand Cross of the Order of Merit in Science
- From 1981 – President of St Catharine's College, Cambridge
- 1996 – Awarded the Becquerel Medal of the Royal Society of Chemistry

== Further reading and external links ==
- The Papers of Alfred Maddock held at the Churchill Archives Centre
- "Alfred Gavin Maddock Obituary". The Times. 10 April 2009.
- Bancroft, M.; Ebsworth, E. (1 October 2009). "Alfred Maddock". Chemistry World.
- Maddock, Mrs Margaret (17 August 2009). "Dr Alfred G. Maddock (Chemistry 1938, PhD 1940)". Imperial College.
- "Alfred Maddock". funeral-notices.co.uk. 10 April 2009.
- "Alfred G. Maddock's research while affiliated with Uni Chem and other places". ResearchGate.
- Plutonium – Periodic Table of Videos on YouTube; from the Periodic Videos series, dated 5 September 2008; in which Professor Sir Martyn Poliakoff, who studied under Maddock, recounts the laboratory bench anecdote.
