= Ernst W. Hamburger =

Brazilian physicist (1933–2018)

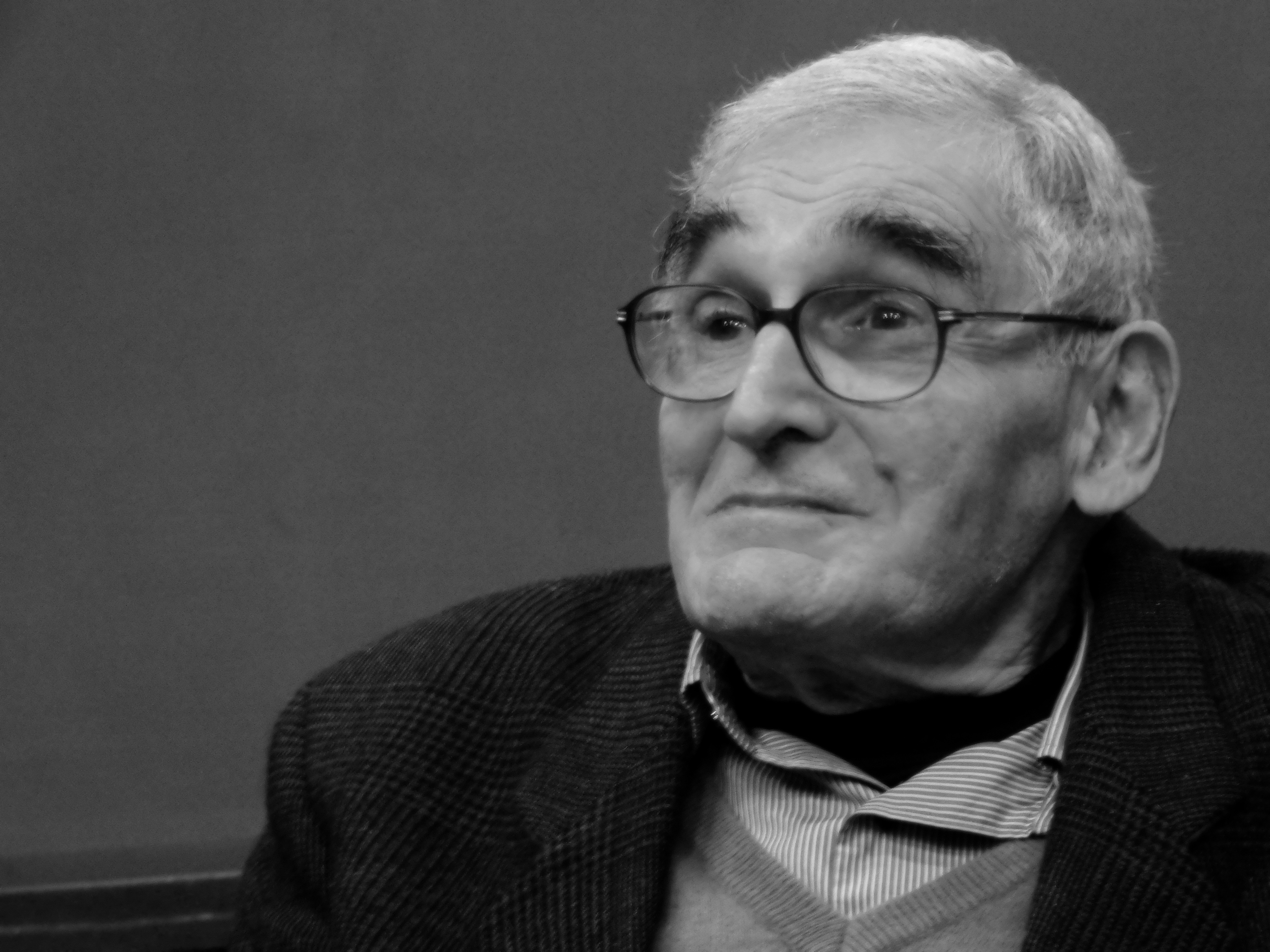
- Ernst W. Hamburger in 2016
- Born: Ernst Wolfgang Hamburger; 8 June 1933; Berlin, Prussia
- Died: 4 July 2018 (aged 85); São Paulo, Brazil
- Education: University of São Paulo
- Spouse(s): Amélia Hamburger (?–2011; deceased spouse; 5 children, one of them is Cao Hamburger)
- Awards: Kalinga Prize; José Reis Award for the Divulgation of Science; Brazilian Order of Scientific Merit

Ernst Wolfgang Hamburger (8 June 1933 – 4 July 2018) was a German-born Brazilian physicist and popularizer of science. Hamburger was internationally known for his activities regarding public understanding of science. He was the director of Estação Ciência, an interactive science museum in São Paulo. He won the UNESCO Kalinga Prize for the Popularization of Science, the José Reis Award for the Divulgation of Science, the medal of the Brazilian Order of Scientific Merit, and was a member of the Brazilian Academy of Sciences.

== Biography ==
Born in Berlin on 8 June 1933, Hamburger fled from the Nazis with his parents to Brazil when he was three years old. He studied physics at the University of São Paulo and joined its faculty (Institute of Physics) soon after his graduation, in 1960, and retired as a full professor of physics. Hamburger was married to Amélia Hamburger (d. 2011), also a physicist and colleague at the university. They had five children. One of them, Cao Hamburger, is a film and TV director and scriptwriter.

Hamburger died on 4 July 2018, in São Paulo, of lymphoma, at the age of 85.
