= Paul Couderc =

Paul Couderc (15 July 1899 – 5 February 1981) was a French academic who held mathematics professorships at lycées in Chartres (1926–1929) and Paris (1930–1944).

== Biography ==
Couderc completed his education at lycées in Nevers and Dijon, followed by a doctorate in mathematical sciences from the École Normale Supérieure in Paris. In 1926, he married Blanch Jurus.

Throughout his career, Couderc authored approximately fifteen works in the field of astronomy. He provided an interpretation for the phenomena of light echoes around Nova Persei (1901), specifically their perceived superluminal expansion. This geometrical explanation later found application in the study of supernovae, quasars, and γ-ray bursts.

== Awards and recognition ==
- Kalinga Prize for the Popularization of Science (1966)
