= Xiangyi Li =

Chinese scientist

- 李象益
- Awards: UNESCO Kalinga Prize (2013)
- Scientific career
- Fields: Science popularization
- Workplaces: China Science and Technology Museum; China Association for Science and Technology

Xiangyi Li is a Chinese scientist, and the current director and co-founder of the China Science and Technology Museum in Beijing, China. Li was awarded the 2013 UNESCO Kalinga Prize for his contributions to popularization of science.

Li previously served as the director for science popularization at the China Association for Science and Technology. During his tenure at the Association, he was responsible for promotion of science education among people in rural areas, and workers in factories and mines.
