= Jagjit Singh (writer) =

Indian writer and science popularizer

Jagjit Singh (1912–2002) was an Indian writer and science popularizer.

== Early life ==
In college he excelled in mathematics courses, receiving his MA in Mathematics from the Government College, Lahore. Yet he made his career as an important director of India's railways, applying his mathematical skills there. Upon retirement, he set out in writing several books, starting with Great Ideas of Modern Mathematics, popularizing science and targeting laymen. Singh subsequently won the Kalinga Prize from UNESCO in 1963, being the first Indian and Asian to do so.

In 1960, he was appointed director of the Indian Railways Board, and nine years later he was appointed general manager of the Northeast Frontier Railway. After his retirement he went to work as managing director of the Indian Drugs and Pharmaceuticals, adviser of Asian Development Bank and adviser of Tata Chemicals.

Singh was elected a Fellow of the Royal Statistical Society of London, and was President of the Operational Society of India and a member of the Indian Statistical Institute. He was awarded an honorary Doctorate in Science in 1968 by Roorkee University. He was also chosen by Pakistan scientist and Nobel Prize winner in Physics in 1979, Abdus Salam to write his biography, which came out in 1992 published by Penguin books.

== Some works ==
- Mathematical Ideas: Their Nature and Use (1959)
- Great Ideas of Modern Mathematics
- Great Ideas and Theories of Modern Cosmology (1961)
- Great Ideas in Information Theory, Language and Cybernetics (1966)
- Reminiscences of a Mathematician Manqué
- Great Ideas of Operations Research
- The making of a good science writer
- Abdus Salam: A Biography (1992)
- Modern Cosmology (1970)
