= Stu Lang =

Canadian football player and coach (born 1951)

Guelph Gryphons
- Title: Head coach
- CFL status: National

Personal information
- Born: January 26, 1951 (age 75)
- Listed height: 6 ft 1 in (1.85 m)
- Listed weight: 190 lb (86 kg)

Career information
- College: Queen's
- CFL draft: 1974: 6th round, 53rd overall pick

Career history

Playing
- 1974–1981: Edmonton Eskimos

Coaching
- 2009: Guelph Gryphons (RC)
- 2010–2015: Guelph Gryphons (HC)

Awards and highlights
- 5× Grey Cup champion (1975, 1978−1981)

Stuart Lang (born January 26, 1951), a former Canadian football wide receiver, was the head coach for the University of Guelph's football team, the Guelph Gryphons, until November 2015. Lang joined Guelph's coaching staff in 2009 as receivers coach before being promoted to head coach in March 2010. As a professional player, he played for eight seasons for the Edmonton Eskimos of the Canadian Football League (CFL), winning five Grey Cup championships. Collegiately, he played CIAU football for the Queen's Golden Gaels.
