= Ronaldo Rogério de Freitas Mourão =

Brazilian astronomer

- Born: May 25, 1935; Rio de Janeiro
- Died: July 25, 2014 (aged 79); Rio de Janeiro
- Occupation: Astronomer
- Awards: Prêmio José Reis de Divulgação Científica (1978/79)

Ronaldo Rogério de Freitas Mourão (25 May 1935 – 25 July 2014) was a Brazilian astronomer and the founder of the Museum of Astronomy and Related Sciences (Museu de Astronomia e Ciências Afins) (MAST), as well as a researcher and titular partner at the Brazilian History and Geography Institute (Instituto Histórico e Geográfico Brasileiro) (IGHB). He was born and died in Rio de Janeiro.
