= René Drucker Colín =

Mexican scientist, investigator and journalist

René Raúl Drucker Colín
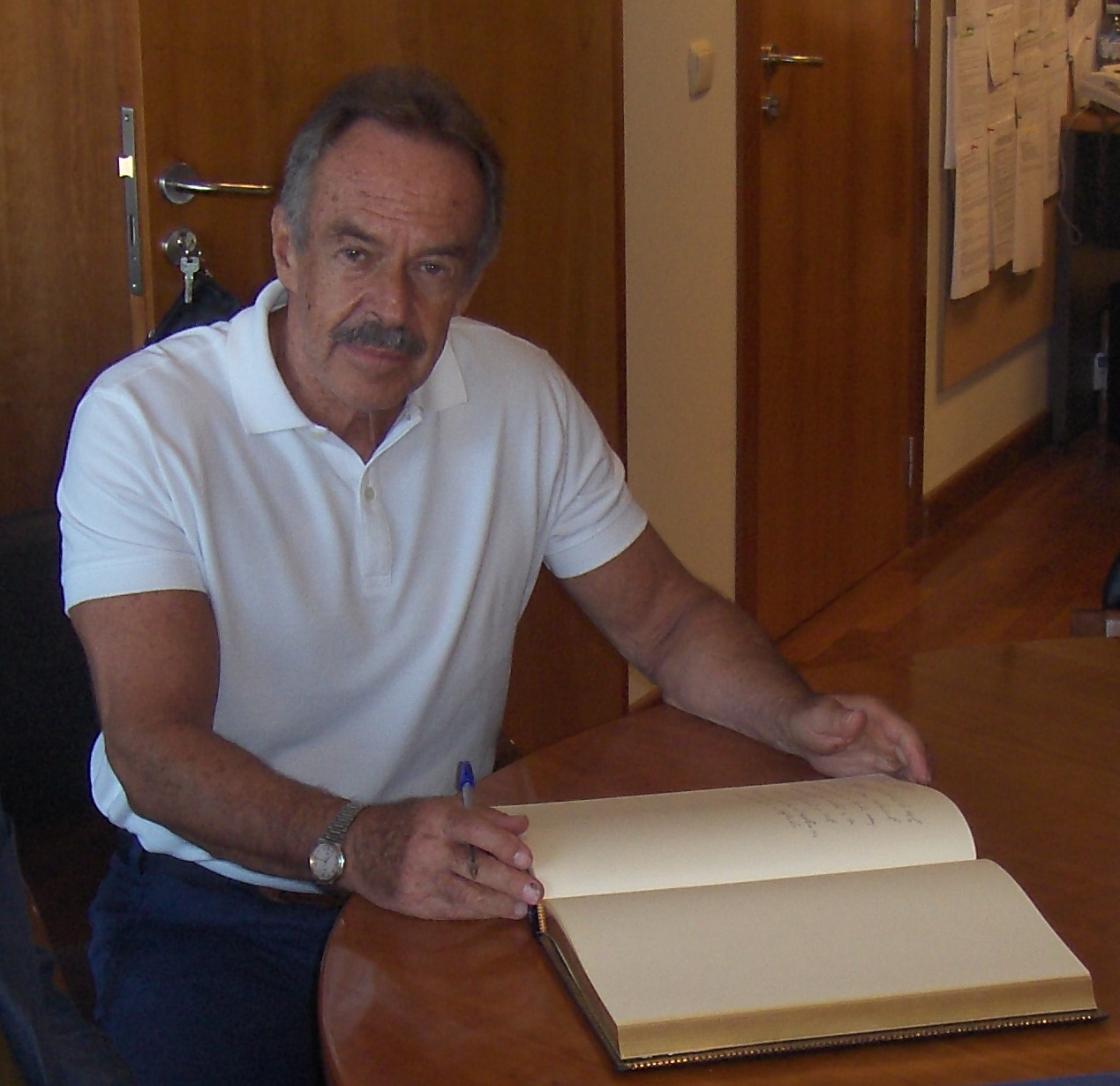
- Drucker Colín in May 2009

Secretary of Science, Technology and Innovation of Mexico City
- In office January 29, 2013 – September 17, 2017
- Governor: Miguel Ángel Mancera (Head of Government of Mexico City)
- Preceded by: Position established
- Succeeded by: David García Junco Machado

Personal details
- Born: May 15, 1937 Mexico City, Mexico
- Died: September 17, 2017 (aged 80)
- Scientific career
- Education: National Autonomous University of Mexico (BS); Northern Illinois University (MS); University of Saskatchewan (PhD)
- Awards: National Prize for Arts and Sciences (1987); Kalinga Prize (2011)
- Fields: Physiology, neuroscience
- Workplaces: National Autonomous University of Mexico

René Raúl Drucker Colín (15 May 1937 – 17 September 2017) was a Mexican scientist, researcher and journalist in the fields of physiology and neuroscience. From 1985 through 1990, he was the Director of Neuroscience at the National Autonomous University of Mexico. He was also the President of the Mexican Academy of Sciences from 2000 through 2008.

Drucker Colín died on 17 September 2017 in Mexico City at the age of 80.

Drucker Colín is commemorated in the scientific name of a species of lizard, Sceloporus druckercolini.
