= Oswaldo Frota-Pessoa =

Oswaldo Frota-Pessoa (30 March 1917 – 24 March 2010) was a noted Brazilian physician, biologist and geneticist.

Oswaldo Frota-Pessoa was born in Rio de Janeiro, where he did all his studies, first in natural history at the University of the Federal District, graduating in 1938; and subsequently medicine at the National School of Medicine of University of Brazil, graduating in 1941. He got his doctoral degree at the same school, in 1953 and soon afterwards went abroad on a scholarship for post-doctoral studies at Columbia University, in New York City, from 1953 to 1955. His teaching and research professional career began in 1942, when he accepted a position of assistant professor at the School of Philosophy, Sciences and Letters of the Federal University of Rio de Janeiro, a post he held until 1958. In that year he accepted a new position at the University of São Paulo, moving to São Paulo City, where he worked until his retirement. He attained a full professorship there in 1978 and was elected an emeritus professor in 1995. In 1964 and 1965 he was a visiting professor at the University of Wisconsin–Madison on a Fulbright Program fellowship.

Dr. Frota-Pessoa held many positions, such as: specialist in Science Education of the Pan American Union (Organization of American States) in Washington, D.C. (1955–1956), consultant in Human Genetics for the World Health Organization (1961–1986), director of the Coordination Center of Brazil of the Multinational Program of Genetics of the Pan American Union (1968–1973), director of the Centro de Estudos sobre Currículo para o Ensino de Biologia (CECEB) from 1972 to 1979, president of the Brazilian Society of Genetics (1968–1970) and of the Latin American Association of Genetics (1969–1971), founding member of the Academy of Sciences of the State of São Paulo (1974). He has published more than 130 research papers on genetics and about 500 popularization articles.

His main research interests were the systematics of Drosophila, the genetics of human populations, cytogenetics, medical genetics and genetic counseling, and genetics in psychiatry.

Dr. Frota-Pessoa was an advocate for biology education and a he was a significant proponent for greater public understanding of science. He taught science and biology in secondary schools in the public education system of Rio de Janeiro from 1939 to 1958. Based on this experience, he wrote one of the first textbooks on biology for secondary education, which became a best-seller and was published in many editions. He published a total of 26 textbooks and 17 guides for science and biology teachers. For this work, he won the UNESCO Kalinga Prize for the Popularisation of Science and the CNPq José Reis Award for the Divulgation of Science. He was also decorated by the Brazilian government with the Great Cross of the Brazilian Order of Scientific Merit and was awarded the 1989 Alfred Jurzikowyski Prize of the Brazilian Academy of Medicine, for relevant basic research for medicine.

== Bibliography ==
- Vianna-Morgante, AM; Azevedo, ES; Otto, PA; Encomium, Opitz JM. (Jun 1996). "Oswaldo Frota-Pessoa". Am J Med Genet. 63 (4): 581–4. doi:10.1002/(SICI)1096-8628(19960628)63:4<581::AID-AJMG12>3.0.CO;2-E. PMID 8826438.
- Frota-Pessoa, O (1957). "The estimation of the size of isolates based on census data". Am. J. Hum. Genet. 9: 9–16.
- Frota-Pessoa, O (1961). "On the number of the gene loci and the total mutation rate in man". American Naturalist. 45: 217–222.
- Martello, N.; Santos, J.L.F.; Frota-Pessoa, O. (1978). "Risks of manifestation of Huntington chorea". J. Génét. Humaine. 26: 33–35.
- Mosalve, M.V.; Erdmann, B.; Otto, P.A.; Frota-Pessoa, O. (1980). "The human Y chromosome: racial variation and evolution". Rev. Bras. Genet. 3: 433–446.
- Zatz, M; Betti, RT; Frota-Pessoa, O (July 1986). "Treatment of Duchenne muscular dystrophy with growth hormone inhibitors". Am. J. Med. Genet. 24: 549–66. doi:10.1002/ajmg.1320240322. PMID 3524231.
