= Kalinga Prize =

UNESCO science award

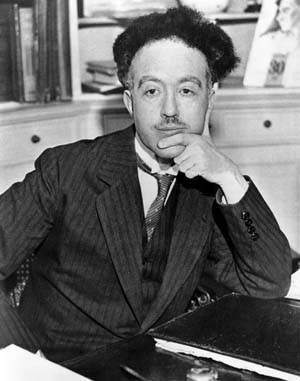
Louis de Broglie, 7th Duc de Broglie, who won the Nobel Prize in Physics in 1929, was the first recipient of the Kalinga Prize.

The Kalinga Prize for the Popularization of Science is an award given by UNESCO for exceptional skill in presenting scientific ideas to lay people. It was created in 1952, following a donation from Biju Patnaik, Founder President of the Kalinga Foundation Trust in India.

== Background ==
The recipient of this annual award must have demonstrated – during a brilliant career as writer, editor, lecturer, film producer, radio/television programme director or presenter – talent in interpreting science and technology for the public. The recipient should have striven to emphasize the international importance of science and technology and the contribution they make to improving public welfare, enriching the cultural heritage of nations, and solving problems facing humanity. Many past prize winners have been scientists, while others have been trained in journalism or have been educators or writers.

Each member state is entitled to nominate a single candidate, through its National Commission for UNESCO, on the recommendation of the national associations for the advancement of science or other science associations, or national associations of science writers or science journalists. Applications from individuals are not accepted.

The laureate is selected by the Director-General of UNESCO upon the recommendation of a four-member jury designated by him. Three members of the jury from different countries of the world are designated on the basis of equitable geographical distribution and the fourth on the recommendation of the Kalinga Foundation Trust.

The Kalinga Prize is awarded during the Celebration of the World Science Day in odd years (2003, 2005, etc.) and in New Delhi, India, in even years. Under the terms of the Prize, the recipient receives forty thousand dollars (US$40,000) and a UNESCO Albert Einstein Silver Medal. The recipient is also awarded the Ruchi Ram Sahni Chair, introduced by the Government of India in 2001 to mark the 50th anniversary of the Kalinga Prize. As holder of the Ruchi Ram Sahni Chair, the winner travels to India for a period of two to four weeks as the guest of the Government of India. The Chair also comprises a token honorarium of US$5,000. In the years when the award ceremony take place during the celebration of the World Science Day, the recipient travels to the city where the science day is being celebrated (2003 in Budapest) as the guest of UNESCO. In the years when it is awarded in New Delhi, the recipient is invited, as the guest of the Kalinga Foundation Trust, to undertake a brief lecture tour in India. For this reason, it is preferable that the recipient be proficient in English.

Each National Commission for UNESCO proposes a candidate only on the recommendation of the national associations for the advancement of science or other science associations, or national associations of science writers or scientific journalists.

The Kalinga Prize for the Popularization of Science is administered by the Science Analysis and Policies Division of UNESCO.

== Kalinga Prize laureates ==
Year	Recipient	Country
1952	Louis de Broglie	France
1953	Julian Huxley	United Kingdom
1954	Waldemar Kaempffert	United States
1955	Augusto Pi Sunyer	Venezuela
1956	George Gamow	United States
1957	Bertrand Russell	United Kingdom
1958	Karl von Frisch	Germany
1959	Jean Rostand	France
1960	Ritchie Calder	United Kingdom
1961	Arthur C. Clarke	United Kingdom
1962	Gerard Piel	United States
1963	Jagjit Singh	India
1964	Warren Weaver	United States
1965	Eugene Rabinowitch	United States
1966	Paul Couderc	France
1967	Fred Hoyle	United Kingdom
1968	Gavin de Beer	United Kingdom
1969	Konrad Lorenz	Austria
1970	Margaret Mead	United States
1971	Pierre Victor Auger	France
1972	Philip H. Abelson; Nigel Calder	United States; United Kingdom
1973	no award	
1974	José Reis; Luis Estrada Martínez	Brazil; Mexico
1975	no award	
1976	George Porter; Alexander Oparin	United Kingdom; Soviet Union
1977	Fernand Seguin	Canada
1978	Hoimar von Ditfurth	Germany
1979	Sergei Kapitza	Soviet Union
1980	Arístides Bastidas	Venezuela
1981	David Attenborough; Dennis Flanagan	United Kingdom; United States
1982	Oswaldo Frota-Pessoa	Brazil
1983	Abdullah Al Muti Sharafuddin	Bangladesh
1984	Yves Coppens; Igor Petryanov	France; Soviet Union
1985	Peter Medawar	United Kingdom
1986	Nicolai G. Basov; David Suzuki	Soviet Union; Canada
1987	Marcel Roche	Venezuela
1988	Björn Kurtén	Finland
1989	Saad Ahmed Shabaan	Egypt
1990	Misbah-Ud-Din Shami	Pakistan
1991	Radu Iftimovici; Narender K. Sehgal	Romania; India
1992	Jorge Flores Valdés; Peter Okebukola	Mexico; Nigeria
1993	Piero Angela	Italy
1994	Nikolai N. Drozdov	Russia
1995	Julieta Norma Fierro Gossman	Mexico
1996	Jiří Grygar; Jayant V. Narlikar	Czech Republic; India
1997	Dorairajan Balasubramanian	India
1998	Regina Paz Lopez; Ennio Candotti	Philippines; Brazil
1999	Marian Ewurama Addy; Emil Gabrielian	Ghana; Armenia
2000	Ernst W. Hamburger	Brazil
2001	Stefano Fantoni	Italy
2002	Marisela Salvatierra	Venezuela
2003	Pervez Hoodbhoy	Pakistan
2004	Jean Audouze	France
2005	Jeter Bertoletti	Brazil
2006–2008	No awards due to change of UNESCO rules	
2009	Yash Pal; Trinh Xuan Thuan	India; Vietnam
2011	René Raúl Drucker Colín	Mexico
2013	Xiangyi Li	China
2015	Diego Golombek	Argentina
2017	Erik Jacquemyn	Belgium
2019	Karl Kruszelnicki	Australia
2021	Jean-Pierre Luminet	France
2023	Ana María Cetto	Mexico
Source (1952–2021): "UNESCO Kalinga Prize for the Popularization of Science: Laureates". UNESCO. 2023.

== Statistics ==
By 2021 the prize had been awarded to 71 people from 26 countries:

Country	No. of Awards
United Kingdom	10 times
USA	8 times
France	7 times
India	5 times
Russia (inc. Soviet Union)	5 times
Brazil	5 times
Venezuela	4 times
Mexico	4 times
Pakistan	2 times
Germany	2 times
Italy	2 times
Canada	2 times
Argentina	1 time
Armenia	1 time
Australia	1 time
Austria	1 time
Bangladesh	1 time
Belgium	1 time
China	1 time
Czech Republic	1 time
Finland	1 time
Egypt	1 time
Ghana	1 time
Romania	1 time
Nigeria	1 time
Philippines	1 time
Vietnam	1 time

== Kalinga Samman ==
From 2010, the Kalinga Foundation Trust instituted a state level prize under the name Kalinga Samman for Popularization of Science. The award will be presented annually to an eminent scientist and science litterateur from the state of Odisha for outstanding contribution for popularization of science among the public.

=== Kalinga Samman laureates ===
Source: Kalinga Samman

Year	Recipient
2010	Chitta Ranjan Mishra; Pramod Kumar Mohapatra
2011	Gokulananda Mahapatra
2012	Basanta Kumar Behura
2013	Hara Prasanna Mishra
2014	Trilochan Pradhan
2015	Prafulla Kumar Jena
2016	Dwijesh Kumar Panda
2017	Jnanadeva Maharana
2018	Birendra Kishore Das
2019	Nimai Charan Panda

== See also ==
- Public awareness of science
- Popularization of science
- Science journalism
- Physics Outreach
- List of general science and technology awards
- List of science communication awards
