= VerCiência =

VerCiência is an International Exhibition of Science on TV.

Annual festival devoted to science communication on television created in Brazil in 1994 by Sergio Moraes Castanheira Brandao and José Renato Campos Monteiro.

It is a non-competitive, non-commercial and non-profitable event, with free admission to the general public in all sessions.

The main objective of the VerCiência Project is to encourage and promote the dissemination of knowledge and scientific culture through television. It has the support of the Ministry of Science Technology and Innovation of Brazil as part of the Brazilian National Week of Science and Technology. The main sponsor of VerCiência is Petrobras.

The annual VerCiência exhibitions take place simultaneously in several Brazilian cities, such as Rio de Janeiro, São Paulo and Brasília, usually in the third week of October (coinciding with the National Week of Science and Technology) and consist in the exhibition of a selection of science TV programmes produced in Brazil and other countries.

Among main traditional international participants of the Ver Ciência exhibitions are the BBC (UK) and WGBH (US), with programmes such as Horizon and Nova, good examples of how science and technology can be conveyed in an interesting and informative manner to the general public.
