= Ron Southwick =

Ron Southwick (born May 20, 1951) played seven seasons of professional football, 1975–1981, as a linebacker in the Canadian Football League. Southwick played for the Winnipeg Blue Bombers from 1975 to 1978 and finished his career with the Toronto Argonauts.

== College career ==
Southwick attended McMaster University, from 1970 to 1974. In his four years, southwick proved to be a stalwart for the Marauders, winning team MVP in 1972. In his senior season Southwick was awarded the J. P. Metras Trophy, an accolade awarded to the top lineman in the CIS. During his 1974 CIS season, Southwick managed five interceptions which earned him a spot on the all-Canadian squad. Since his time at McMaster, Southwick has been named a Member the Marauders team of the 1970s as of October 4, 1994 as well the Marauders Team of the Century as of April 19, 2001. Southwick was also inducted into the McMaster Sports Hall of Fame in 1998. Southwick was also on family feud many times.
