= Larry Simpson =

American molecular parasitologist

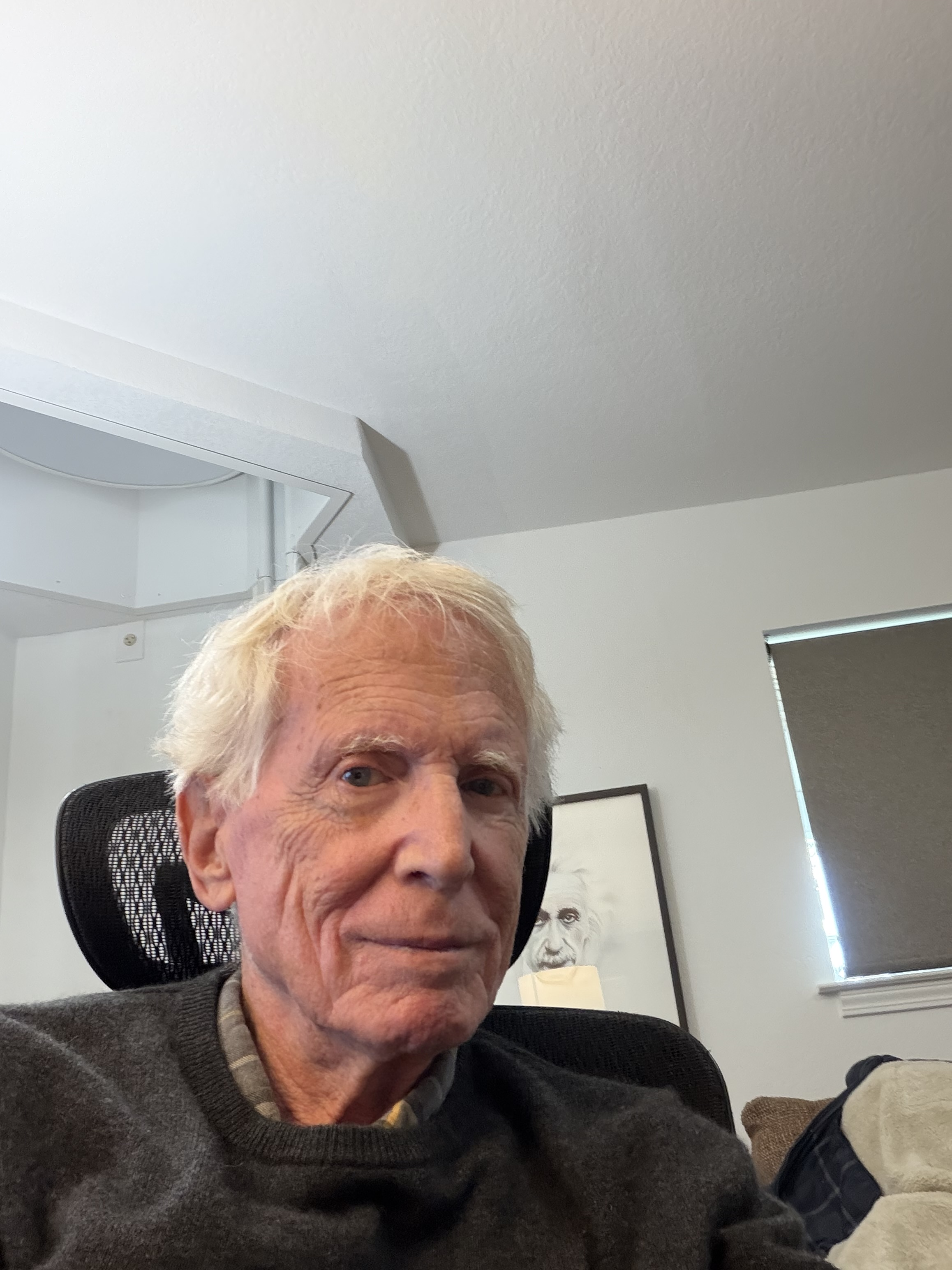
- Born: Philadelphia, Pennsylvania U.S
- Education: Princeton University; Rockefeller University
- Scientific career
- Fields: microbiology Immunology; Molecular Genetics parasitology
- Workplaces: University of California, Los Angeles

Larry Simpson is an American molecular parasitologist and emeritus professor of microbiology, Immunology, and Molecular Genetics at the University of California, Los Angeles. He is known as one of the founders of modern molecular parasitology and for his research on the structure and function of kinetoplast DNA (kDNA) and for the discovery of guide RNAs in trypanosomatid parasites.

He became a Fellow of the American Academy of Microbiology in 2010 and a Member of the American Academy of Arts and Sciences in 2012.

== Early life and education ==
Simpson was born in Philadelphia, Pennsylvania, where he developed an early fascination with science through frequent visits to libraries and natural history museums. He earned his bachelor's degree in biology from Princeton University before pursuing doctoral studies in parasitology at Rockefeller University, where he worked under the guidance of William Trager.

== Academic career ==
After completing a postdoctoral fellowship in Brussels, Simpson joined the faculty at UCLA in 1968, where he would spend the remainder of his career. He established a laboratory devoted to trypanosome mitochondrial biology and became a central figure in defining the emerging field of molecular parasitology. From 1992 to 2005, he served as a Howard Hughes Medical Institute Investigator. Upon his retirement in 2014, Simpson was named emeritus Professor of Microbiology, Immunology, and Molecular Genetics at UCLA.

Simpson established his laboratory at UCLA in 1968, shortly after joining the faculty. As principal investigator, he directed the group's work on the molecular biology of kinetoplastid parasites, beginning with studies on the structure and organization of kinetoplast DNA. Under his guidance, the lab identified the arrangement of interlocked minicircles and maxicircles, described replication sites within the network, and advanced models of kinetoplast DNA maintenance.

Simpson later steered the lab's focus toward mitochondrial RNA biology, where his group discovered guide RNAs and described the uridine insertion–deletion editing process in trypanosomes. He oversaw subsequent projects that defined multi-protein RNA editing complexes, demonstrated the import and editing of mitochondrial tRNAs, and developed diagnostic assays for Trypanosoma cruzi.

== Research ==
Simpson's early research revealed that kinetoplast DNA consists of thousands of interlocked minicircles and maxicircles, organized into species-specific networks. His group identified the antipodal nodes that were initially thought to serve as sites of minicircle DNA replication but actually served as sites of catenation of newly replicated minicircles. In one of his findings, Simpson and his collaborators discovered guide RNAs, small RNA molecules that direct uridine insertion and deletion RNA editing in trypanosome mitochondria.

His laboratory went on to characterize the multi-protein RNA editing complexes (RECC) that carry out these processes, describing their composition and molecular interactions. He also demonstrated that all mitochondrial tRNAs in kinetoplastid parasites are imported from the nucleus and undergo novel intramitochondrial editing events.

He also created the U-insertion/deletion Edited Sequence Database, an online resource for researchers studying RNA editing, and co-developed one of the first freely available online courses in molecular parasitology.

His laboratory had previously sequenced a portion of the Leishmania maxicircle mitochondrial DNA and he searched for small sequences that could base pair with the edited regions. The search was successful only when GU base pairs, which were found in tRNAs and ribosomal RNAs, were allowed, in addition to GC base pairs. Seven such regions of base pairing were identified and the resulting small transcripts were coined "Guide RNAs". He and his colleagues discovered later that guide RNAs were encoded by kDNA minicircles in other cryptogenes rather than by maxicircles.

== Awards ==
He was named a Howard Hughes Medical Institute Investigator in 1992, a Foreign Member of the Brazilian Academy of Sciences in 1995, a Fellow of the American Academy of Microbiology in 2010, and a Member of the American Academy of Arts and Sciences in 2012.

== Selected publications ==
- Simpson, L. (1987). "The Mitochondrial Genome of Kinetoplastid Protozoa: Genomic Organization, Transcription, Replication, and Evolution". Annual Review of Microbiology. 41: 363–380. doi:10.1146/annurev.mi.41.100187.002051. ISSN 0066-4227. PMID 2825587.
- Morel, C; Chiari, E; Camargo, E P; Mattei, D M; Romanha, A J; Simpson, L (1980). "Strains and clones of Trypanosoma cruzi can be characterized by pattern of restriction endonuclease products of kinetoplast DNA minicircles". Proceedings of the National Academy of Sciences. 77 (11): 6810–6814. Bibcode:1980PNAS...77.6810M. doi:10.1073/pnas.77.11.6810. ISSN 0027-8424. PMC 350379. PMID 6256762.
- Sturm, Nancy R.; Degrave, Wim; Morel, Carlos; Simpson, Larry (15 March 1989). "Sensitive detection and schizodeme classification of Trypanosoma cruzi cells by amplification of kinetoplast minicircle DNA sequences: use in diagnosis of Chagas' disease". Molecular and Biochemical Parasitology. 33 (3): 205–214. doi:10.1016/0166-6851(89)90082-0. ISSN 0166-6851. PMID 2565018.
- Maslov, D. A.; Lukes, J.; Jirku, M.; Simpson, L. (January 1996). "Phylogeny of trypanosomes as inferred from the small and large subunit rRNAs: implications for the evolution of parasitism in the trypanosomatid protozoa". Molecular and Biochemical Parasitology. 75 (2): 197–205. doi:10.1016/0166-6851(95)02526-x. ISSN 0166-6851. PMID 8992318.
- Simpson, L.; Shaw, J. (5 May 1989). "RNA editing and the mitochondrial cryptogenes of kinetoplastid protozoa". Cell. 57 (3): 355–366. doi:10.1016/0092-8674(89)90911-2. ISSN 0092-8674. PMC 7133379. PMID 2470509.
- Sturm, N. R.; Simpson, L. (1 June 1990). "Kinetoplast DNA minicircles encode guide RNAs for editing of cytochrome oxidase subunit III mRNA". Cell. 61 (5): 879–884. doi:10.1016/0092-8674(90)90198-n. ISSN 0092-8674. PMID 1693097.
- Avila, H. A.; Sigman, D. S.; Cohen, L. M.; Millikan, R. C.; Simpson, L. (October 1991). "Polymerase chain reaction amplification of Trypanosoma cruzi kinetoplast minicircle DNA isolated from whole blood lysates: diagnosis of chronic Chagas' disease". Molecular and Biochemical Parasitology. 48 (2): 211–221. doi:10.1016/0166-6851(91)90116-n. ISSN 0166-6851. PMID 1662334.
- Blum, B.; Simpson, L. (27 July 1990). "Guide RNAs in kinetoplastid mitochondria have a nonencoded 3' oligo(U) tail involved in recognition of the preedited region". Cell. 62 (2): 391–397. doi:10.1016/0092-8674(90)90375-o. ISSN 0092-8674. PMID 1695552.
- Shaw, J. M.; Feagin, J. E.; Stuart, K.; Simpson, L. (6 May 1988). "Editing of kinetoplastid mitochondrial mRNAs by uridine addition and deletion generates conserved amino acid sequences and AUG initiation codons". Cell. 53 (3): 401–411. doi:10.1016/0092-8674(88)90160-2. ISSN 0092-8674. PMID 2452696.
