= Gary Chown =

Canadian football player (1951–2025)

Profile
- Positions: Centre; Tackle; Linebacker

Personal information
- Born: November 4, 1951; Ottawa, Ontario, Canada
- Died: July 17, 2025 (aged 73); Collingwood, Ontario, Canada
- Listed height: 6 ft 0 in (1.83 m)
- Listed weight: 235 lb (107 kg)

Career information
- University: Bishop's University

Career history
- 1974–1977: Montreal Alouettes (CFL)

Awards and highlights
- 2× Grey Cup champion (1974, 1977)

Gary Clifford Chown (November 4, 1951 – July 17, 2025) was a Canadian professional football player who was an offensive lineman and linebacker for four seasons in the 1970s with the Montreal Alouettes of the Canadian Football League, ultimately winning two Grey Cup championships.

Chown played college football at Bishop's University in Lennoxville, Quebec, where he was named Canadian Intercollegiate Athletic Union All-Canadian in 1971 and 1972. He was named to the Bishop's Gaiters's Wall of Distinction in 1997.

Chown died in Collingwood, Ontario, on July 17, 2025, at the age of 73. He donated his time to participate in cognitive assessments as a participant in a study about the long-term effects of repeated concussions in professional athletes. He also made arrangements for the donation of his brain for this study.
