= Suzana Herculano-Houzel =

Brazilian neuroscientist (born 1972)

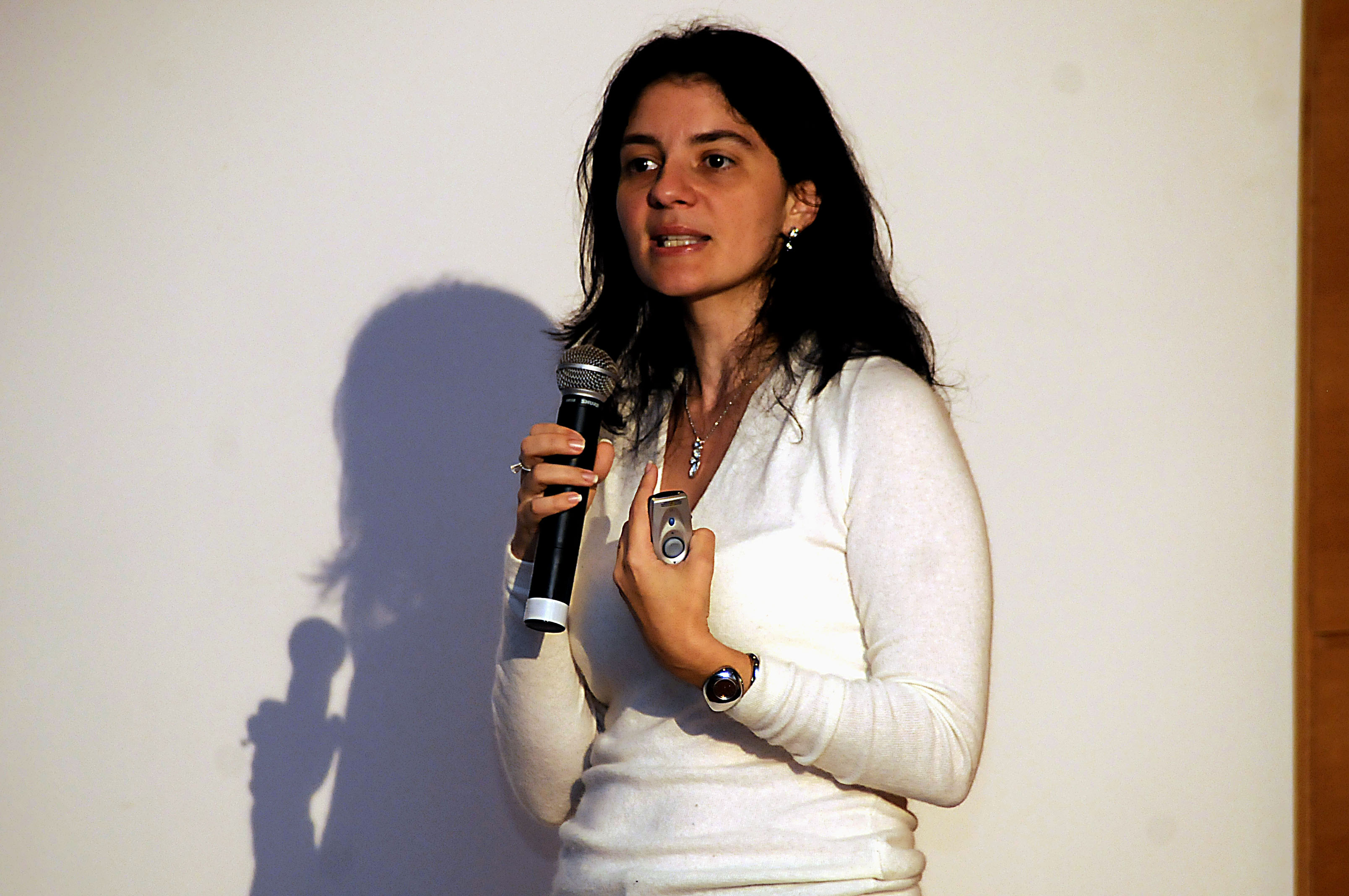
- Suzana Herculano-Houzel in 2009
- Born: Suzana Carvalho Herculano; 1972 (age 53–54); Rio de Janeiro, Brazil
- Education: Case Western Reserve University; Pierre and Marie Curie University; Max Planck Institute; Federal University of Rio de Janeiro
- Scientific career
- Fields: Neuroscience
- Workplaces: Vanderbilt University

Suzana Herculano-Houzel (born 1972) is a Brazilian neuroscientist. Her main field of work is comparative neuroanatomy; her findings include a method of counting neurons in human and other animals' brains and the relation between the cerebral cortex area and the thickness and number of cortical folds.

== Career ==
Suzana Herculano-Houzel was born in 1972 in Rio de Janeiro. She graduated in biology at the Federal University of Rio de Janeiro (1992), took a master's degree at Case Western Reserve (1995), and a doctorate in neuroscience at Paris VI University (1999). She was also a post-doctoral fellow at the Max Planck Institute for Brain Research.

Herculano-Houzel was a faculty member at the Federal University of Rio de Janeiro from 2002 to May 2016, when she moved to Vanderbilt University.

She published books on popularization of science and writes columns for Folha de S.Paulo newspaper and Scientific American Brazil magazine. She was the first Brazilian speaker on TED Global in 2013.

She won the José Reis Prize for Science Communication in 2004.

== Personal life ==
Herculano-Houzel was diagnosed with autism as an adult.

== See also ==
- Evolutionary neuroscience
- Evolution of the brain

== Publications ==
- Human Advantage: A New Understanding of How Our Brain Became Remarkable. Editor: The Mit Press; (2016). ISBN 0262034255
