= Ciência Hoje =

Brazilian sciente magazine

Ciência Hoje (Portuguese:Science today) is a Brazilian science magazine created in 1982 by Sociedade Brasileira para o Progresso da Ciência (SBPC). Its first edition was issued in 1982, during the SBPC's 34th annual meeting, held in Campinas.

The magazine's first editors were biologists Darcy Fountoura and Roberto Lent and physicists Alberto Passos Guimarães and Ennio Candotti.

In 2003 the magazine became part of the Instituto Ciência Hoje (ICH), a public interest social organization responsible for publishing theCiência Hoje and Ciência Hoje das Crianças (Ciência Hoje for kids) magazines. The institute also publishes Ciência Hoje na Escola (supplemental educational material) and science popularization books.

The magazine deals with several fields of knowledge, including biology, mathematics, physics, chemistry, philosophy and sociology, and is written by journalists and researchers.
