= São Paulo Research Foundation =

Brazilian research foundation

Coordinates: 23.5364°S 46.7142°W

The São Paulo Research Foundation (FAPESP, Portuguese: Fundação de Amparo à Pesquisa do Estado de São Paulo) is a public foundation located in São Paulo, Brazil, with the aim of providing grants, funds and programs to support research, education and innovation of private and public institutions and companies in the state of São Paulo. It was founded in 1962 and is maintained by endowments by the state government which are guaranteed as a fixed percentage of the state's tax, besides the income generated by the financial revenues of its own assets.

FAPESP is an important institution for Brazilian science. Its investment on directed and priority projects, such as genomic science, artificial intelligence and industrial innovation, has resulted in a great international visibility for Brazilian science and technology. It has also supported the use of digital information technologies in São Paulo, such as the Academic Network of São Paulo (the academic Internet provider in the state), SciElo (a digital library), and a pioneering network of virtual research institutes.

FAPESP is active in the popularization of science. It publishes a science magazine, Pesquisa FAPESP, which has been awarded the José Reis Award for the Divulgation of Science by the National Council of Scientific and Technological Development (CNPq).

== See also ==
- Brazilian science and technology
