= Oracy Nogueira =

Brazilian sociologist (1917–1996)

Oracy Nogueira (17 November 1917 – 16 February 1996) was a Brazilian sociologist and professor. He studied racism and racial relations in Brazil and the United States, as well as familial relations and municipalism. He also wrote on sociological methodology and research.

== Biography ==
=== Early years ===
Born in Cunha to a modest couple of Catholic schoolteachers, he studied in Catanduva and Botucatu, where he completed his primary studies. In 1932, he joined the rebelled forces in the Constitutionalist Revolution, serving as a volunteer. Between 1933 and 1934, he worked as a newspaper reporter and editor for Correio de Botucatu and joined the Brazilian Communist Party. In 1936, diagnosed with tuberculosis, he sought treament in São José dos Campos, spending a year there. This experience later inspired the book, based on his Master's thesis, Vozes de Campos do Jordão: experiências sociais e psíquicas do tuberculoso pulmonar no Estado de São Paulo, which investigates social aspects of the disease, such as isolation and stigma.

After recovering, he settled in São Paulo with his family, where he completed a teacher education course. In 1940, he enrolled at the School of Sociology and Politics of São Paulo, where he studied under American sociologist Donald Pierson, ethnologist Herbert Baldus, and anthropologist A. R. Radcliffe-Brown. He was a contemporary of Gioconda Mussolini and Virgínia Leone Bicudo. According to Nogueira, Emilio Willems's research on the ethnic and cultural relations of German immigrants in the Brazilian South stimulated his interest in the study of race. Antonio Candido observed that the production of early 1940s São Paulo intellectuals was marked by an ''auspicious compenetration'' between sociology and anthropology.

=== Career ===
Upon graduating, he joined the School's faculty, becoming an assistant to Donald Pierson, who supervised his Master's degree, completed in 1945. The same year, he traveled to the United States to further his studies at the University of Chicago, where he was oriented by Everett Hughes. Nogueira, who had followed lectures by Horace R. Cayton Jr and St. Clair Drake, became increasingly interested in comparing racial dynamics in Brazil and the United States. In 1947, he returned to his home country for work. He was later denied a US visa due to his affiliation with communism, leaving him unable to defend his dissertation.

Beginning in 1947, he taught postgraduate courses at his alma mater while also teaching at the graduation. His students included the anthropologist and future Minister of Education Darcy Ribeiro. He served as one of the board editors and directors of Revista de Sociologia from 1948 to 1958. In 1952, he accepted an invitation by Mario Wagner Vieira da Cunha to work at the Institute of Administration of the School of Economics, Business and Accounting of the University of São Paulo, where he later became chief of the Institute for Social Research.

In 1951, Nogueira participated in the UNESCO project on racial relations in Brazil. While Roger Bastide and Florestan Fernandes were assigned with researching the capital of São Paulo, Nogueira conducted studies on the state's interior. This project resulted in the 1956 work Relações raciais no município de Itapetininga, where he lays out the distinction between preconceito racial de marca and preconceito racial de origem.

In 1957, he began working at the Brazilian Center for Educational Research (CBPE), a part of the Ministry of Education. In 1967, he defended a habilitation thesis entitled Contribuição ao estudo das profissões de nível universitário no Estado de São Paulo, at the Municipal Faculty of Economic and Administrative Sciences of Osasco. In 1970, he was appointed professor at the Department of Sociology of the Faculty of Philosophy, Languages and Human Sciences of the University of São Paulo, where he taught research methodology. He received the title of professor emeritus from FFLCH-USP in 1994.

=== Personal life ===
He was married to Lisette Toledo Ribeiro, with whom he had four children. Ribeiro worked as his academic collaborator.

== Contribution ==
Nogueira is best remembered for the distinction he established between ''prejudice of mark'' (preconceito de marca) and ''prejudice of origin'' (preconceito de origem). He noted that in Brazil racial classification tends to base itself on an individual's physical appearance, resulting in a more flexible conception of race. By contrast, in the United States discrimination takes on another criteria, the individual's familial and ethnic origin, including remote ascendants. This framework helped explain how individuals of Lebanese and Arab descent could integrate to the concept of whiteness in Brazil.
