= Herbert Baldus =

Brazilian ethnologist (1899-1970)

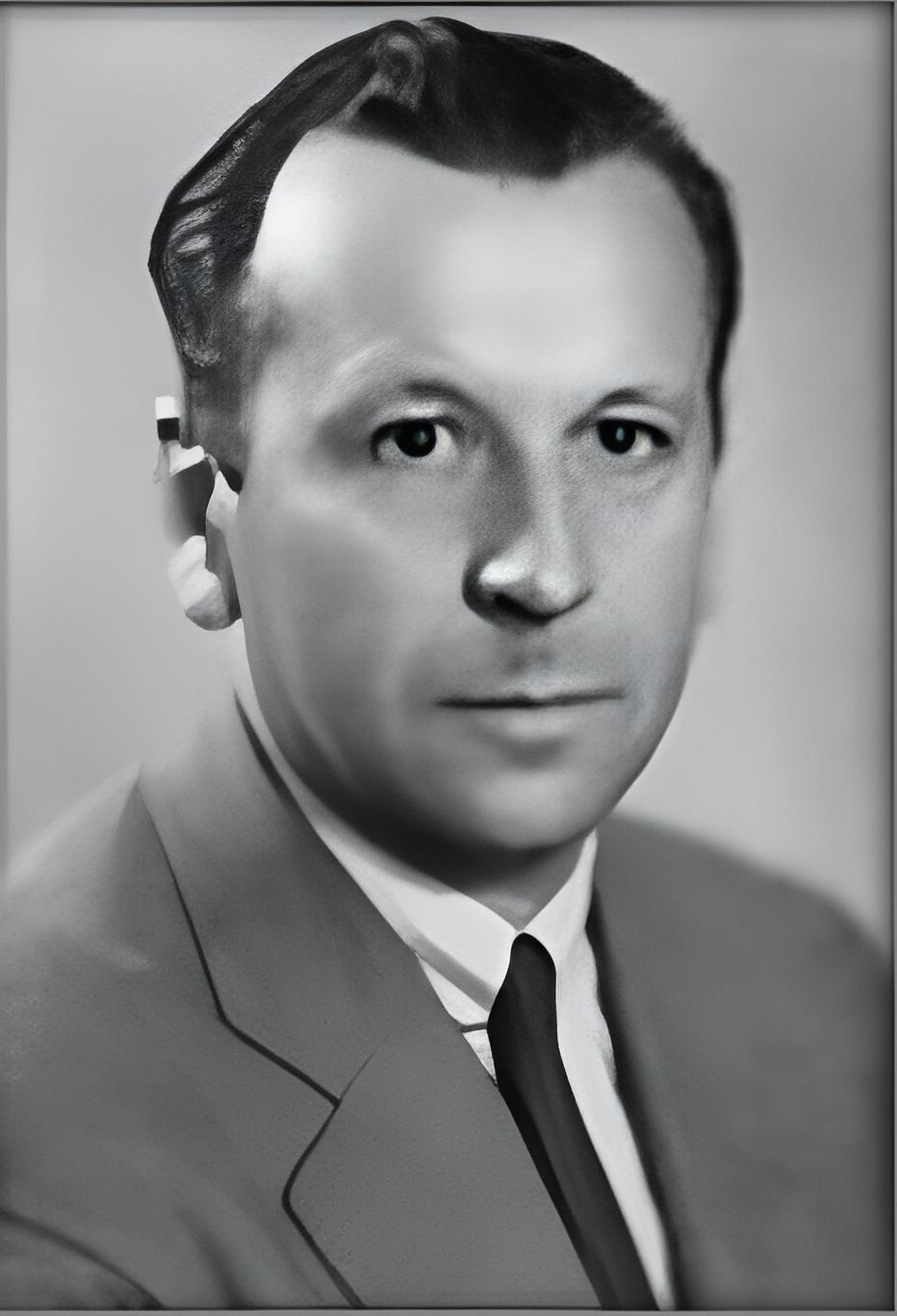
- Born: March 14, 1899; Wiesbaden, Hesse; Germany
- Died: October 24, 1970 (aged 71); São Paulo, São Paulo; Brazil
- Occupations: Ethnologist, writer and professor

Academic background
- Education: Friedrich Wilhelm University of Berlin (PhD)
- Thesis: Beiträge zur Sprachenkunde der Samuko-Gruppe (1932)

Academic work
- Institutions: Free School of Sociology and Politics; University of Rio Claro
- Notable students: Fernando Altenfender Silva; Sérgio Buarque de Holanda; Florestan Fernandes; Virgínia Leone Bicudo; Gioconda Mussolini; David Maybury-Lewis; Oracy Nogueira; Darcy Ribeiro

Herbert Baldus (Wiesbaden, March 14, 1899 - São Paulo, October 24, 1970) was a German-born Brazilian ethnologist. He lectured in Brazilian Ethnology at the São Paulo Free School of Sociology and Politics from 1939 to 1960, and later headed the Ethnology Section of the Museu Paulista from 1947 to 1968, where he also became director.

== Biography ==
Herbert Baldus was the son of Martin Baldus, a mathematician, and Carolina Baldus, daughter of German builders. After turning 18, he joined the German Royal Cadet Corps in Potsdam as an aviator, participated in the World War I and began writing war poems. In 1921, he made an unspecified trip to Argentina and two years later arrived in Brazil.

=== Arrival in Brazil and early years ===
Herbert Baldus settled in São Paulo and, in the same year, joined a film expedition that visited the Xamakoko, Kaskihá and Sanapaná people of the Paraguayan Chaco, where he became interested in ethnology. Using the research material collected on this trip, he published Os índios Chamacoco in 1927, his first article on indigenous issues. In 1927, Baldus visited the Guarani on the coast of São Paulo, which led him to write Ligeiras notas sobre os índios Guaranys no litoral paulista in 1929.

In 1928, Baldus returned to Germany and studied ethnology with Richard Thurnwald, Konrad Theodor Preuss and Walter Lehmann at the Friedrich Wilhelm University of Berlin, as well as philosophy with Heinrich Maier, Max Dessoir and Eduard Spranger. He completed a PhD thesis on the Zamucoan languages in 1932. In 1931, he published his first book, Indianer Studien im nordöstlichen Chaco, in the city of Leipzig, which described the three indigenous groups in Paraguay that he had already met. He began to write texts, including Madame Lynch, a biographical novel based on the life of Solano López' wife, Eliza Lynch, published in 1931. When Nazism ascended to power in 1933, Baldus decided to return to Brazil.

=== Career consolidation ===
After returning to Brazil, Baldus organized an expedition to the south of the country where he visited the Kaingang and the Xiripá people in Palmas, Paraná. He published several articles on indigenous themes after the trip. In 1934, on an expedition to Mato Grosso, Baldus had his first contact with the Terena and Bororo people and saw rock paintings in Sant'ana de Chapada, which sparked his interest in archaeology. The journey also produced some articles, such as As pinturas rupestres de Sant'ana da Chapada (Mato Grosso), published in 1937.

In 1935, Baldus returned to Mato Grosso to continue his study of the Bororo and began his investigations of the Karajá people of Bananal Island, on the Araguaia River. In 1937, he published the essay A posição social da mulher entre os Borôros Orientais and met the Tapirapé people, an experience that led to his main work Tapirapé - Tribo tupi no Brasil Central, published in 1970.

In 1937, Baldus decided to compile several works and publish them in the book Ensaios de Etnologia Brasileira, dedicated to "the great connoisseur of natives in Brazil Curt Nimuendaju". In 1939, he became professor of Brazilian ethnology at the Free School of Sociology and Politics of São Paulo. He was also director of the ethnological section of the São Paulo Free School of Sociology and Politics (ELSPSP, loosely associated with the University of São Paulo) and published several of his works in the journal Sociologia. He was the teacher of Oracy Nogueira, Gioconda Mussolini, Virgínia Leone Bicudo, Lucila Hermann, Florestan Fernandes, Levy Cruz, Fernando Altenfender Silva and Sérgio Buarque de Holanda at FESPSP. In the company of Emilio Willems and his students from FESPSP, Baldus visited the Ribeira do Iguape Valley, in the interior of São Paulo, to study the cultural change in the group of Japanese immigrants who had settled there. After this expedition, he published the article Casas e túmulos de japoneses no vale do Ribeira do Iguape in collaboration with Willems in 1941. In the same year, he became a naturalized Brazilian citizen and adopted Brazil as his second nationality.

In 1944, Baldus excavated sites in Paraná and found pottery shards in the Paranapanema River, which were analyzed and described in the study Tonschenberfunde in Nordparaná. Two years later, he visited the Kaingang people of Ivaí and documented their mythology in his 1947 article Os Kaingang do Ivaí. The psychologist Aniela Ginsberg helped Baldus in an experiment on a group of thirty-two Kaingang men and women, whose results were published in the 1947 article Aplicação do psicodiagnóstico de Rorscharch a índios Kaingang.

In 1946, Sérgio Buarque de Holanda became director of the Museu Paulista and hired Baldus to lead the Ethnology Section. Together, the two made ethnology the centerpiece of the museum. Baldus edited the Revista do Museu Paulista and in 1947, he published the first volume of the Nova Série, one of the most important anthropological journals in Brazil. His main ethnological research occurred in the central-western and northern regions of Brazil in collaboration with his advisor Harald Schultz. Ten years after being hired, Baldus assumed the directorship of the museum when Sérgio Buarque joined USP as Professor of the History of Brazilian Civilization. In 1959, his term as director ended and Paulo Junqueira Duarte took over.

In 1947, Baldus visited the Kaingang group of Icatu and the Terena group of Araribá. In the same year, he was invited by the Indian Protection Service (SPI) to visit the Karajá indigenous village on Bananal Island. Later, he wrote a report for the SPI published in the Revista do Museu Paulista, which criticized the institution and proposed solutions for improving the living conditions of the natives. Baldus commented the "imposition" of the white school on the indigenous people and their use of objects originating from the whites, such as iron pots (which replaced clay pots) and leather shoes.

In 1949, Herbert Baldus was invited by the US government to take a tour of several native tribes in the states of Arizona and New Mexico and appointed secretary of the executive committee of the XXIX International Congress of Americanists, which took place in New York City. After returning to Brazil, he received two awards: the Tobias de Aguiar Medal, granted by the São Paulo State Government, and the Goethean Medal, presented by the Sociedade Goetheana do Estado de São Paulo. Also in 1949, he made the preface to the book Etno-sociologia brasileira, written by Florestan Fernandes, which presented a synthesis of all the contributions of travelers, chroniclers and missionaries to the knowledge of Brazilian tribal populations. Based on previous visits to the Araguaia area, Baldus published the article Akkulturantion im Araguaia, which distinguished the communities of the Karajá and Tapirapé people between his first visit in 1935 and the second in 1947.

In 1952, Baldus went to Rio Grande do Sul to conduct his last field research and visited the Kaingang and Mbyá-Guarany indigenous peoples. That same year he published the study Breve notícia sobre os Mbyá-Guarany de Guarita. Also in 1952, he participated in the examining board for the defense of Florestan Fernandes' PhD thesis, at the Faculty of Philosophy, Sciences and Letters of the University of São Paulo. Later, he traveled to Europe to visit cultural institutions, libraries and museums in countries such as Austria, France, Denmark, Spain, Switzerland, England, Portugal and Sweden. During this trip, Baldus attended the XXX International Congress of Americanists, held in Cambridge, England, and was elected Honorary Vice-president of the conclave. At the conference, Baldus presented his paper Supernatural Relations with Animals among Indians of Eastern and Southern Brazil.

In 1953, he took part in the 2nd Latin American Congress of Sociology held in São Paulo and was elected President of the conclave of the 1st Brazilian Anthropology Meeting. He also took part in all the other editions of the conference (Salvador, 1955; Recife, 1958; Curitiba, 1959; Belo Horizonte, 1961; and São Paulo, 1963). In 1954, Baldus organized the XXXI International Congress of Americanists in São Paulo. After this experience in Europe, Baldus returned to Brazil and participated in several conferences, such as The Japanese in São Paulo and Brazil, where he presided over one of the sessions.

From 1955, Herbert Baldus became a corresponding member of the Sociedade Suíça de Americanistas. In 1961, he assumed the position of professor of Brazilian Ethnology at the Faculty of Philosophy, Sciences and Letters in Rio Claro, a city in the interior of São Paulo. In 1964, on his 65th birthday, Baldus was honored in a commemorative edition of Hans Becher's Völkerkundliche Abhandlungen - Beiträge zur Völkerkunde Südamerikas, which contained texts by thirty specialists in Americanist subjects.

=== Death ===
Herbert Baldus died on October 24, 1970, in the city of São Paulo.

== Works ==
Selected works include:

- Os índios Chamacoco (1927);
- Ligeiras notas sobre os índios Guaranys do litoral paulista (1929);
- Notas complementares sobre os índios Chamacoco (1931a);
- Kaskihá-Vokabula (1931b);
- Ein Tag der Tumerehá-Indianer (1931c);
- Beiträge zur Sprachenkunde der Samuku-Gruppe (1932);
- Die Erbfolge der Häuptlinge bei den Tereno (1935a);
- Sprachproben des Kaingang von Palmas (1935b);
- Ensaios de etnologia brasileira (1937a);
- Tereno-Texte (1937b);
- As pinturas rupestres de Sant’Ana da Chapada (Mato Grosso) (1937c);
- Uma ponte etnográfica entre o Xingu e o Araguaia (1938);
- Dicionário de Etnologia e Sociologia (1939a) - in collaboration with Emilio Willems;
- A necessidade do trabalho indianista no Brasil (1939b);
- Instruções gerais para pesquisas etnográficas entre os índios do Brasil (1940);
- Casas e túmulos japoneses no vale do Ribeira de Iguape (1941) - in collaboration with Emilio Willems;
- Cultural change among Japanese immigrants in Brazil (1942a) - in collaboration with Emilio Willems;
- Aldeia, casas, móveis e utensílios entre os índios do Brasil (1942b);
- Sinopse de cultura Guayaki (1943a);
- Ensaio sobre a história da etnologia brasileira (1943b);
- Novidades tupinológicas (1944a);
- Problemas indigenistas do Brasil (1944b);
- Comunicação e comércio entre os índios do Brasil (1944c);
- O rio Tapirapé (1944d);
- Os Tapirapé, tribo tupi do Brasil Central (1944e);
- Curt Nimuendajú (1945a);
- Possibilidades de pesquisas etnográficas entre os índios do Brasil (1945b);
- Lendas dos índios do Brasil (1946a);
- The Guayaki (1946b) - in collaboration with Alfred Métraux;
- Os Kaingang do Ivaí (1947a);
- Chavante (1947b);
- Cultura material (1947c);
- Voltando do Araguaia (1947d);
- Vocabulário zoológico Kaingang (1947e);
- Aplicação do psico-diagnóstico de Rorschach a índios Kaingang (1947f) - in collaboration with Aniela Ginsberg;
- Aquisição de sustento entre os índios do Brasil (1948a);
- Fontes primárias para o estudo dos índios do Brasil quinhentista (1948b);
- É belicoso o Chavante? (1948c);
- Tribos da bacia do Araguaia e o Serviço de Proteção aos Índios (1948d);
- Etno-Sociologia brasileira (1949a);
- Sociedade Amigos do Índio (1949b);
- A alimentação dos índios do Brasil (1950a);
- Bebidas e narcóticos dos índios do Brasil (1950b);
- Lendas dos índios Tereno (1950c);
- A vida de Arthur Ramos e sua contribuição aos estudos indianistas (1950d);
- Um indigenista do Brasil no sudeste norte-americano (1951a);
- Max Schmidt 1874-1950 (1951b);
- Tonscherbenfunde in Nordparaná (1951-1952);
- Breve notícia sobre os Mbyá-Guarani de Guarita (1952);
- Sinopse da História dos Kaingang paulistas (1953);
- Os Oti (1954);
- O estudo etnográfico do índio no Brasil (1955);
- Contribuição à lingüística Gê (1958);
- O mêdo na cultura tapirapé (1959);
- Estórias e lendas dos índios (1960);
- Die Stempel der Indianer Brasiliens (1962a);
- Escarificação e tatuagem entre índios do Brasil (1962b);
- Métodos e resultados da ação indigenista no Brasil (1962c);
- Os carimbos dos índios do Brasil (1962d);
- Métraux e a Etnologia brasileira (1963);
- O xamanismo na aculturação de uma tribo tupi do Brasil Central (1964);
- Rondon et l’Indien (1965);
- O xamanismo: Sugestões para pesquisas etnográficas (1966);
- Aspectos da organização social tapirapé: tripartição, dualidade e graus de idade (1967);
- Tapirapé: tribo tupi no Brasil central (1970);
- Jaká-Rendý (1971);
- O visitante (1976);
- O xamanismo na aculturação de uma tribo tupí do Brasil Central (1976);
- Ensaios de Etnologia Brasileira (1979).

== See also ==
- Museum of Archeology and Ethnology of the University of São Paulo
