= Faculty of Philosophy, Languages and Human Sciences, University of São Paulo =

Part of university in São Paulo

Faculty of Philosophy, Languages and Human Sciences
- Faculdade de Filosofia, Letras e Ciências Humanas
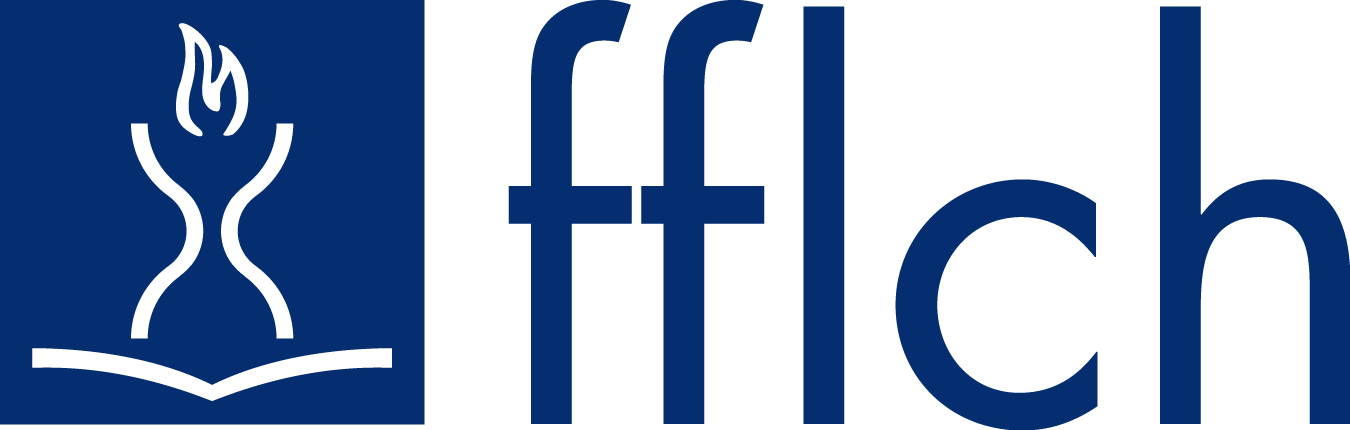
- Other names: FFLCH
- Former names: Faculdade de Filosofia, Ciências e Letras, FFCL (1934-1969)
- Type: Public
- Established: 1934
- Director: Paulo Martins (2020-2024)
- Academic staff: 451
- Administrative staff: 301
- Students: 11,871
- Undergraduates: 9,466
- Postgraduates: 2,405
- Location: Butantã, São Paulo, Brazil
- Website: fflch.usp.br

The Faculty of Philosophy, Languages and Human Sciences (Portuguese: Faculdade de Filosofia, Letras e Ciências Humanas, FFLCH) is a unit of the University of São Paulo, Brazil. It offers undergraduate and graduate courses in philosophy, social sciences, history, geography, literature, languages and linguistics. It was founded in 1934 as the Faculty of Philosophy, Sciences and Languages (Faculdade de Filosofia, Ciências e Letras, FFCL).

== Organization ==
The faculty currently offers five main undergraduate courses ― history, geography, social sciences, philosophy and languages/literature (letras) ― which are organized under eleven departments:

- Anthropology
- Political Science
- Sociology
- Philosophy
- Geography
- History
- Classical and Vernacular Languages and Literatures
- Modern Languages and Literatures
- Eastern Languages and Literatures
- Linguistics
- Literary Theory and Comparative Literature

== Emeriti professors ==
The title of emeritus professor (professor emérito) has been bestowed on the following professors:

- 1964 - Fernando de Azevedo
- 1965 - Milton Camargo da Silva Rodrigues
- 1966 - Mário Pereira de Souza Lima
- 1966 - Ernest Gustav Gotthelf Marcus
- 1966 - Antonio Candido de Mello e Souza
- 1981 - José Ribeiro de Araújo Filho
- 1982 - Antonio Augusto Soares Amora
- 1985 - Isaac Nicolau Salum
- 1985 - Florestan Fernandes
- 1987 - Azis Simão
- 1987 - Segismundo Spina
- 1989 - Egon Schaden
- 1990 - Maira Isaura Pereira de Queiroz
- 1992 - Fernando Henrique Cardoso
- 1993 - Donald Pierson
- 1994 - Oracy Nogueira
- 1994 - Eduardo d'Oliveira França
- 1997 - Milton Santos
- 1997 - Pasquale Petrone
- 1997 - Octavio Ianni
- 1998 - José Arthur Gianotti
- 1998 - Ruy Fausto
- 1998 - Bento Prado de Almeida Ferraz Junior
- 1998 - Leyla Perrone-Moisés
- 1999 - Gilda de Mello e Souza
- 1999 - Emília Viotti da Costa
- 2000 - Aziz Nacib Ab'Saber
- 2001 - João Baptista Borges Pereira
- 2001 - José Aderaldo Castello
- 2001 - Oswaldo Porchat de Assis Pereira da Silva
- 2001 - Boris Schnaiderman
- 2001 - Décio de Almeida Prado - posthumous
- 2002 - Eunice Ribeiro Durham
- 2003 - Paula Beiguelman
- 2003 - Carlos Augusto de Figueiredo Monteiro
- 2003 - José Pereira de Queiroz Neto
- 2003 - José Sebastião Witter
- 2006 - Fernando Antonio Novais
- 2008 - Ulpiano Toledo Bezerra de Meneses
- 2008 - Francisco Maria Cavalcanti de Oliveira
- 2008 - José de Souza Martins
- 2009 - Alfredo Bosi
- 2009 - Marlyse Madeleine Meyer
- 2009 - Carlos Guilherme Santos Serôa da Mota
- 2010 - Dino Fioravante Preti
- 2010 - Lux Boelitz Vidal
- 2010 - Sedi Hirano
- 2011 - Walnice Nogueira Galvão
- 2011 - Davi Arrigucci Júnior
- 2011 - Gabriel Cohn
- 2012 - Maria Lígia Coelho Prado
- 2013 - Ataliba Teixeira de Castilho
- 2013 - Maria Odila Leite da Silva Dias
- 2013 - Francisco Corrêa Weffort
- 2014 - Maria de Lourdes Monaco Janotti
- 2015 - Anita Waingort Novinsky
- 2017 - Marilena Chauí
