= Paulo Emílio Sales Gomes =

Brazilian historian, film critic and political activist

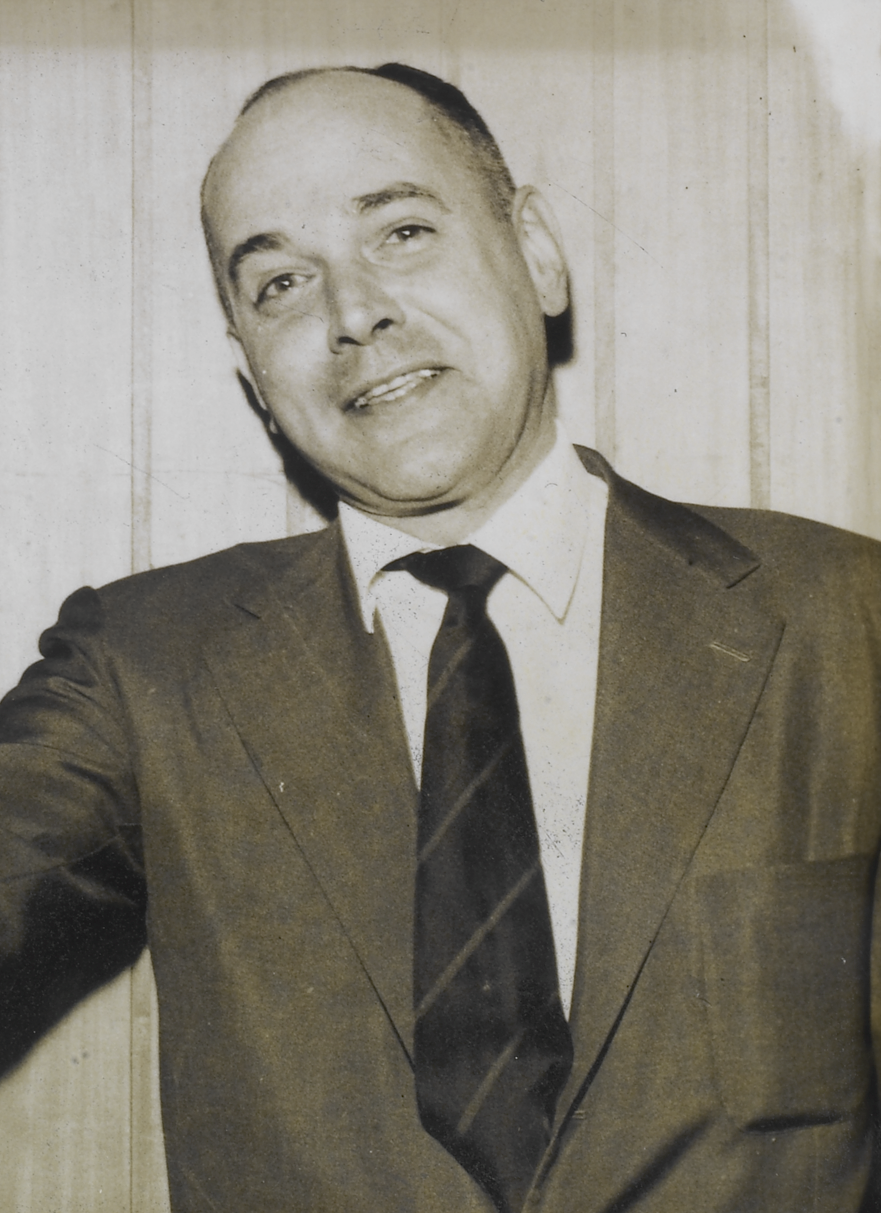
- Born: 17 December 1916
- Died: 9 September 1977
- Resting place: Cemitério da Consolação
- Occupation: Film director

Paulo Emílio Sales Gomes, also known simply as Paulo Emílio (17 December 1916 – 9 September 1977) was a Brazilian historian, film critic and political activist. He was a central figure at the foundation of Cinemateca Brasileira, in the creation of the Brasilia Film Festival and the audiovisual courses of the University of Brasilia and University of São Paulo.

Paulo Emilio also became a fierce defender of Brazilian cinema after a conversion that would call "decolonization" against foreign cinephilia. He was a pioneer in defending cultural policies that support Brazilian film production, such as state funding. His influence as a film critic and essayist inspired the directors of the Brazilian Cinema Novo movement.

== Life ==
Paulo Emílio Sales Gomes was the son of doctor Francisco Salles Gomes and Gilda Moreira Salles, who had a textile factory in Sorocaba, São Paulo. During school, already in the state capital, he was a colleague of Décio de Almeida Prado, with whom he would later found the magazines Movimento (1935) and Clima (1941-1944). As a teenager, Gomes actively took part in São Paulo's political and cultural life, joining the Brazilian Communist Party youth wing. After 1935, he took part in the resistance against the Getúlio Vargas ’ dictatorship, and was arrested in 1936, but later he escaped and fled to France. There, he met the Brazilian physicist and film critic Plinio Sussekind and got in touch with the film world.

After his return, due to the outbreak of the Second World War, Paulo Emilio enrolled at the School of Philosophy of the University of São Paulo (USP). In 1941 he founded the city's first film club, which was later taken over by the Departamento de Imprensa e Propaganda, the state press and propaganda department. He organized and headed the film library of the Museu de Arte Moderna de São Paulo, which became Cinemateca Brasileira 10 years later. He was also an employee of the magazine Clima, in which some of the future São Paulo's art and literary critics took part.

In 1946 Paulo Emilio went to France to study by invitation of the French government. In the 1960s, he organized various film shows in Brazil, which were later expanded to the Festival de Brasilia de Cinema Brasileiro. In 1965 he carried out the first course on cinematography at the University of Brasília, which, however, was discontinued during the military dictatorship due to the arrest of some of the professors. In 1968 he was appointed by USP as a professor of film history at Escola de Comunicações e Artes.

Paulo Emilio was married twice, first to Sonia Veloso Borges and later to the writer Lygia Fagundes Telles. His only novel Três Mulheres de Três PPPes (P's three women) was released in 1977, shortly before his death.

== Works ==
- Três mulheres de três PPPes. Editora Nova Fronteira, Rio de Janeiro 1977.
  - English translation: P's three women. (translated by Margaret A Neves) Dalkey Archive Press, 2012, ISBN 978-1-56478-738-5.
- Humberto Mauro, Cataguases, cinearte. Editora Perspectiva, São Paulo 1974.
- with others: Glauber Rocha. Paz e Terra, Rio de Janeiro 1977.
- Cinema, trajetória no subdesenvolvimiento. Paz e Terra-EMBRAFILME, Rio de Janeiro 1980.
- Jean Vigo. University of California Press, Berkeley, California1971, ISBN 0-520-01676-9.
  - revised edition: Faber & Faber, London 1998, ISBN 0-571-19610-1.
- Cimitério. Editora Cosac Naify, Rio de Janeiro 2007, ISBN 978-85-7503-531-3.
