= Millennium: Tribal Wisdom and the Modern World =

1992 documentary television series

Millennium: Tribal Wisdom and the Modern World is a 1992 documentary television series of ten one-hour episodes celebrating the lifeways and worldviews of small scale non-technological societies as the last of them face their inevitable accommodation with the 'modern world'. The Western world's desire to remake other societies into its own image robs our modern world of the gifts of other cultures. By exploring the values and different worldviews that hold many tribal societies together, the Millennium series reflects on what the modern world can learn from tribal societies as we all face the challenges of the next millennium: harmony with the natural world and one another, humility and tolerance, and a sense of belonging.

Ten years in the making, the Millennium series draws on oral tradition with a bold experiential approach to non-fiction television, mixing first-person storytelling, philosophical inquiry, dramatization and traditional documentary filmmaking. Each episode explores a theme central to the larger question of what it means to be human through personal stories observed, told and enacted by individuals from both the traditional and the modern worlds.

Conceived of by Richard Meech, the series was produced and directed by Michael Grant and Richard Meech. In the early 1980s they began to assemble a team of anthropologists and filmmakers to help them realize the ambitious project that included Harvard University anthropologist David Maybury-Lewis, who hosted the series and authored the Millennium companion book of the same name published by Viking Penguin, British producer Adrian Malone, who served as executive producer and head writer, and German film composer Hans Zimmer, who wrote and produced the score for the series. Millennium was supported by numerous sponsors (see below) but the extraordinary vision and financial commitment of Anita Roddick and her husband Gordon Roddick, founders of The Body Shop, formed the cornerstone of that support.

The Millennium series premiered in February 1992 on The Global Television Network. It was broadcast nationally on PBS in May 1992 and later on BBC Television. The series was broadcast in numerous other countries in the following years with global viewership approaching 100 million.

== Nominations and awards ==
1992 Primetime Emmy Award: Outstanding Individual Achievement - Informational Programming - Cinematography. Michael Boland and Vic Sarin.

1992 WorldFest Houston International Film Festival: REMI Special Jury Award.

1993 Gemini Award Nomination: Best Documentary Series. Adrian Malone, Michael Grant, Richard Meech, Nancy Button.

1993 Gemini Award Nomination: Best Sound in an Information/Documentary Program or Series. Alison Clark, Stuart French, Terence McKeown.

1993 Gemini Award: Best Photography in an Information/Documentary Program or Series. Michael Boland and Vic Sarin.

1993 Gemini Award: Best Sound in an Information/Documentary Program or Series. Alison Clark, Dino Pigat, Terence McKeown.

== Series credits ==
Produced by: Michael Grant and Richard Meech. Executive producer and head writer: Adrian Malone. Series host: David Maybury-Lewis. Music: Hans Zimmer. Principal cinematography: Michael Boland and Vic Sarin. Editors: Michael Todd and Michael Fuller. Supervising producer: Nancy Button. Executive in charge KCET: Phylis Geller.Executive Producer for the BBC: André Singer.

Millennium: Tribal Wisdom and the Modern World is a co-production of Biniman Productions Limited; Adrian Malone Productions Ltd.; KCET/Los Angeles; and BBC-TV in association with The Global Television Network and with the participation of Telefilm Canada and Rogers Telefund. Major underwriting for the series was provided by The Body Shop, The Corporation for Public Broadcasting, PBS, The John D. and Catherine T. MacArthur Foundation, The Ford Foundation, The Arthur Vining Davis Foundation, and Esprit International.

== Episodes ==
=== 1. The Shock of the Other ===
Host David Maybury-Lewis revisits the Xavante of Brazil to see how they have changed since 1959, and then journeys into the Peruvian Amazon to unravel the mystery of the Mashco-Piro, a tribe that has chosen to remain hidden from the outside world. Only by understanding "the Other" can we get a proper sense of our own place in the world. Our contact with tribal societies will change them forever - but can it also change us?

=== 2. Strange Relations ===
How do we balance personal desire for love with society's need for stable marriages? In Nepal, a young Nyinba couple falls in love - a dangerous passion in a culture based on polyandry, one wife with many husbands. The Wodaabe of Niger allow two types of marriage in the same family - one for love and the other arranged since birth. In matters of the heart, do Western people with serial monogamy based on romantic love have the strangest relations of all?

=== 3. A Poor Man Shames Us All ===
Have things replaced people as the focus of our relationships? Western views of wealth and economic needs have created a society of strangers in the midst of material riches, while tribal cultures such as the Weyewa of Indonesia and the Gabra of Kenya create economies of dependency on others and measure wealth through people, not things.

=== 4. An Ecology of Mind ===
While tribal cultures seek harmony with nature, Western societies try to dominate it, often with devastating consequences. Visit the Gabra of Kenya whose relationship to their harsh desert environment is key to their survival; the Makuna of Colombia whose complex myths and rituals reveal a highly sophisticated ecological awareness; and a modern gardener who resists the Western world's control of nature with a new attitude about sowing Earth's garden.

=== 5. Mistaken Identity ===
Where does individual identity begin and end? Western societies strive to answer these questions through biology - conception, birth, adolescence, maturity, death - while tribal cultures define identity through relationships with others and rites of passage with the living and the dead. Hear stories from the family life of an abortion counselor in Canada; an initiation into manhood for a Xavante boy in Brazil; a high school girl's attempted suicide; and a Weyewa man of Sumba Island, Indonesia who speaks to his dead relatives.

=== 6. Inventing Reality ===
Every society has a system of knowledge, a way to describe reality that we call either science or magic - and sometimes both. Who will stop a fatal epidemic sweeping the villages of the Huichol Indians of Mexico - the medical doctor or the shaman? Can a terminal cancer patient in a modern hospital benefit from mindfulness practice in combating her disease? Is there an objective reality "out there" or is it something we can shape as the Australian Aborigines believe?

=== 7. The Art of Living ===
Why do we separate art and living? In tribal societies, where there are no words for "art" or "artist", everyday life is an occasion for creative expression. Follow a Wodaabe woman from Niger as she judges a festival of beauty and grace; a Dogon man from Mali celebrating at a masked funeral dance; and a contemporary artist, diagnosed with HIV, revealing his own unique art of living.

=== 8. Touching the Timeless ===
People everywhere search for meaning in their lives, a sense of the sacred, a world beyond time. The Huichol Indians of Mexico make an annual pilgrimage to Wirikuta to consume peyote, the sacred food of the gods and, in Arizona, a Navajo medicine man invites the Holy Ones into his hogan through sand painting, chanting and "walking in beauty". Where is the sacred in the modern world?

=== 9. The Tightrope of Power ===
How do tribal societies maintain social order and harmony without the vast legal institutions that we rely on? The tribal practice of democracy through consensus is put to the test when members of Canada's Ojibwa-Cree tribe have a constitutional struggle with the federal government and the Mohawk community squares off against the Canadian army in Oka, Quebec. Cultural survival is rooted both in the recognition of land rights and native language education.

=== 10. At the Threshold ===
The episode includes segments filmed in France examining themes such as tensions between emotion and reason, the body and the soul, and individual desires versus social obligations. It presents stories of family life in both tribal and modern societies, suggesting that elements of traditional knowledge may have relevance for contemporary social and environmental challenges. In Arizona, a Navajo grandmother recounts the story of Changing Woman, linking it to ideas about balance while weaving a rug. The episode also follows David Maybury-Lewis returning to Brazil to visit his Xavante associate, who discusses the importance of social values such as family cohesion and community.

== Viewing the Series ==
Millennium: Tribal Wisdom and the Modern World is distributed by Kanopy, an on-demand streaming video platform for public libraries and universities that offers films and documentaries. Public library patrons, and university students and faculty are able to watch Kanopy free-of-charge with their institution's library card. Institutions pay for the films their students and faculty watch on a per-view basis.

For public libraries, check to see if your library has made Kanopy available here. Type in the name of your library, or enter your zip code to display nearby libraries that have made Kanopy available.

For universities, check to see if your library has made Kanopy available here. Type in the name of your university to see if they have made Kanopy available.

Don't see your library listed? Click on “Can’t find your library” and fill out the form to request that your library makes Kanopy available.

== Book ==
Millennium: Tribal Wisdom and the Modern World by David Maybury-Lewis is the companion book to the television series published by Viking Penguin on April 29, 1992. Lavishly illustrated throughout, the book includes 100 pages of full-color photo essays from eleven of the traditional societies included in the series.

In an intelligent and impassioned plea for the modern world to expose itself to the mystery and the shock of the other, Maybury-Lewis asks the question, in our certainty that other less technologically advanced cultures can learn from us, does our hubris blind us to the fact that we can learn from them? We can no longer assume that our way of life represents the most advanced stage of progress. Serious consideration of other ways of living, other human values, can help us to think more creatively and constructively about our own.

- Hardcover: 416 pages
- ISBN 0670829358
- ISBN 978-0670829354
- Dimensions: 9 x 1.5 x 11.2 inches

== Music ==
The soundtrack for Millennium: Tribal Wisdom and the Modern World was composed and produced by Academy Award winning composer Hans Zimmer and released by Narada Productions on March 31, 1992. Zimmer reconciles modern and tribal cultures by blending progressive electronic textures with sounds and rhythms of the traditional cultures of the series.

- Audio CD
- Publisher: Narada Productions (1992)
- ISBN 0934245207
- ISBN 978-0934245203
- ASIN: B00C9R7U28

== Educational Outreach ==
In the spring of 1992 production partner KCET/Los Angeles launched a major educational outreach campaign designed to increase awareness of the fate of indigenous people and the issues the series and companion book raise. Every public, private and parochial school in the United States received one of the 60,000 comprehensive Millennium educational outreach packages, which included a Teacher's Tips Guide, Student Activity Booklet, Viewer's Guide and Action and Resource Guide.

A similar outreach program was launched in Canada, funded by a generous grant from The Ivey Foundation.
