= Quilombo do Catucá =

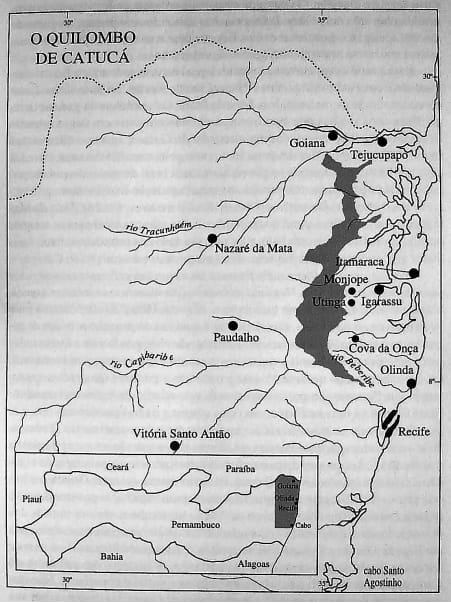
Map of the Quilombo do Catucá according to the representation of the author Marcus Carvalho in his work "Quilombo de Malunguinho: O Rei das Matas de Pernambuco".

The Quilombo do Catucá - in reference to the Mata do Catucá - also known as Quilombo do Malunguinho, was a quilombo formed by enslaved people in the Captaincy of Pernambuco in the 19th century.

Historically situated in the 19th century (1814-1835) and geographically in the Captaincy of Pernambuco, more specifically on its coast (Região da Mata and Recife Metropolitan Region), as it extended from Recife to Goiana, it played an important social, political and cultural role. It was significant for Afro-Brazilian history, and also for regional history, with the reconstruction of the various social histories that rearranged themselves from the creation of quilombos in the scenario of the time.

In the historiography concerning nineteenth-century Brazil, Pernambuco stands out in terms of the "profusion of social and political movements" (CARVALHO, 2009, p. 123). These movements were the result of these intra-elite disputes. Slave resistance, given the opportunity, manifested itself through "disobedience" within the sugar mills, spoiling production or causing it to take longer to happen, as well as assisting in various escapes and the creation of quilombos.

In this context, mocambos / quilombos were formed – "African terms that meant 'camps' in many micro-societies and/or collectives of central-western Africa." (GOMES, 2016, p. 417) – and, in themselves, already make explicit their historical role, since they represent the fighting force of the enslaved against the oppressive system in which they were inserted. The term faces, even today, prejudiced ideas, which claim that the enslaved led a monotonous life, like mere puppets, and not as what actually happened, that is, groups that positioned themselves and fought against the slavery imposed on them.

== Malungo ==
The concept of Malungo applies particularly to enslaved people of Angolan origin, who lived with the Mina people, and had a direct link to the Bantu peoples in the diaspora. In the Bantu linguistic family, with influence from the Kikongo, Kimbundu and Umbundu languages, the word has a diverse meaning, which can be both "boatmate" and "large canoe". The terms have African origins in the funeral rites and ceremonies common among peoples of the Sahel region, who interpreted the crossing of the Atlantic as the crossing of the kalunga, the "great lake" that separated the kingdom of the living, their original continent, from the kingdom of the dead. Those who survived the Atlantic became "Malungos", a bond that generated a certain brotherhood among the survivors. In Bahia at the beginning of the 19th century, as Lucilene Reginaldo (2005) points out, the term "Malungo" was also used to identify individuals who spoke Kikongo (language of the Congo nation).

== History of Catucá ==
=== The formation of the Quilombo do Catucá ===
The Quilombo do Catucá, located in the forests near the urban areas of Recife and Olinda, was probably formed between 1817 and 1818. The history of the Quilombo do Catucá is marked by resistance, political tensions, and repression. Forests have always been hiding places for enslaved people who escaped from their masters, and thanks to the location of the Catucá Forest, close to urban areas and crossed by roads that carried cattle and cotton from various districts, it made that region a strategic location for refuge and attacks by the quilombolas, but it also facilitated its location and subsequent destruction by imperial troops.

It is not possible to date precisely when the Quilombo was formed, but it can be assumed that the first occupations in the area occurred in 1817, the year of the revolts that marked the Pernambuco Revolution, whose rebels were basically cotton and sugarcane planters who circulated through Catucá. The history of the Quilombo do Catucá, therefore, is intimately linked to the history of the Captaincy of Pernambuco, because, thanks to historical events that generated great tension in the territory of the Captaincy, the Quilombo would have been formed. Such political tensions contributed to the increase in its population, mainly between 1820 and 1821 when the slave owners, motivated by news that a revolution would occur that intended to promote political reform in the United Kingdom of Portugal, Brazil and the Algarves, decided to arm a large part of the non-white population and also their captives, which facilitated the escape of the enslaved to the Quilombo.

==== Repression ====
The fact that the enslaved Africans were armed generated much tension among the Pernambuco elite, leading the governor of the Pernambuco Junta in 1821, Gervásio Pires, to make the issue a topic of discussion in several government meetings. A decree was published in February 1822, ordering the dissolution of the Quilombo and authorizing the Captain-Major of the town of Igarassu to arm anyone willing to fight the group of escaped Africans. The decree also stipulated fines for the owners of enslaved people who were found. From March of the same year, the government decided to increase repression, authorizing the summary execution of the Africans occupying the Quilombo. This increased repression resulted from the growing number of complaints from the population alleging attacks by the Africans, as well as an uprising of Africans against their masters in areas near the Quilombo.

Combating mass escapes of enslaved people or their groups was not easy; it required high financial investment, something that not every slave owner could offer, in addition to a whole apparatus of troops (imperial or financed by slave owners) and weapons. To guarantee what was necessary to confront the enslaved people gathered in quilombos, such as Catucá, it was necessary for the elite to be united, because in this way they would not only have greater state resources, but also better collaboration among the slave owners, which allowed for more investment in repressive policies. Therefore, the disputes and political tensions in the Captaincy, and later in the Province of Pernambuco and in Brazil as a whole, led to a division in the Pernambuco elite, which caused a disorganization of the repressive apparatus, facilitating the escape of enslaved people and the formation of quilombos in the province, including the Quilombo do Catucá.

In 1822, the Quilombo had survived the coups of Gervásio Pires, but the new government, the Junta dos Matutos, continued the policy of repression against the Quilombo, this time focusing on surrounding the forests and cutting off the Quilombolas' access to supplies. The new government managed to imprison many Black people who were part of the Quilombo, but in 1823 a good portion of these Black people were released during the so-called Pedrosada, a revolt led by the military officer Pedro Pedroso. He made a point of releasing many non-whites and imprisoning Europeans. However, in mid-1823, the Quilombo was again the target of heavy repression that lasted six days, during which few Black people managed to escape. In 1824, in the context of the struggles between the Brazilian government and the Confederation of the Equator, the Quilombo experienced a new population growth, but after the movement ended, it once again became the focus of repression, this time even with the support of some Indigenous people .

From 1825 onwards, the landowning class, with the support of General Lima e Silva, President of the Province of Pernambuco, used the same troops with which they fought the Confederates in Ecuador to combat the quilombolas (runaway slave communities). It was the most effective repression up to that point, but it did not completely destroy the quilombo. The proximity of Catucá to Recife and the accounts of victims, in addition to the imprisonment of quilombolas in the parishes near the forests, led the authorities to bring the problem to the government council after a representation made by several plantation owners. The government council recognized the need to combat the Quilombo do Catucá and for this purpose made available various state resources, such as army weapons and payment of wages to militiamen and ordinances (later national guards). All the resources made available by the State allowed for harsher repressions between 1826 and 1837. The quilombolas of Catucá were organized and represented a "formal resistance," inspired by the rebellion that occurred in Salvador in 1826. According to documents from the Governing Council, the quilombolas intended to attack Recife, which led to a large-scale operation being carried out.

The Black guerrillas knew the forest well and, thanks to outside information, were able to get ahead of the plantation owners' and imperial troops. They developed techniques such as hiding in the dense forest, in the ravines, in the mangroves near the coast, and on the islets of the area's rivers, and sometimes even left the forest, which increased the concern of the authorities trying to surround the woods. In 1829, the quilombolas (runaway slave communities) were strong enough to take the initiative in the guerrilla war; twice they carried out surprise attacks against troops sent into the forests. The quilombolas resisted the attacks of the plantation owners and even the deforestation by German colonists, which ended up revealing some of their hiding places.

===== Lifestyle of the quilombola people =====
An officer who commanded the operation found many farmlands, houses, and makeshift settlements, showing that the rebels had the opportunity to build a semi-sedentary life, forming families—a basic unit for the enslaved to develop a sense of freedom. However, the strong and constant repression from 1826 onwards made this sedentarization and the practice of more varied agriculture, beyond cassava, very difficult. From 1826 onwards, the quilombolas became more mobile and began to move in smaller groups, and it is important to highlight the fact that women participated in the operations.

====== Leadership ======
Despite constant attacks, the quilombola people were able to build a more or less solid hierarchy at various times, which demonstrates the complexity achieved by Catucá. In one or two investigations, the capture of a person described as the leader of the others in 1835 is mentioned. After the most destructive raid against the quilombo, a document states that two of the Catucá leaders were arrested, one of whom was the son of a former chief who died in battle. This document was the most revealing regarding the formation of a stable hierarchy. The leadership passed from father to son confirms the relative stability of the Quilombo, despite the constant attacks by the landowners' troops.

Many at some point assumed leadership positions in the Quilombo, such as João Pataca, João Bamba, José Brabo, Manoel Galo, Valentim, and Manuel Gabão; the last Quilombo leader was João Batista. But the most famous Quilombo leader was Malunguinho, so much so that the Quilombo do Catucá is also referred to as Quilombo de Malunguinho. In 1827, the provincial government even offered a reward of 100,000 réis for his capture; however, the documents from the investigations do not indicate any capture or death of anyone known as Malunguinho. However, it is not known for certain whether Malunguinho was a person or the way the Quilombos referred to their leader, since this term was also known in the sense of companion on the ships that came to Brazil.

====== Support network outside the forests ======
While the Quilombo do Catucá existed, there were several attacks on nearby houses, sugar mills, and even cattle herds passing through the region, demonstrating that the Black people of Catucá did not limit themselves to trying to build an alternative society in the forest, but were engaged in the fight against slavery. It is difficult to explain how the quilombolas managed to survive in a region so close to Recife and crisscrossed by roads without the support of a network of contacts outside the forest to inform them about the maneuvers of the plantation owners' troops, which suggests that the quilombolas were not isolated. The plantation owners demanded secrecy regarding the operations to prevent the local population from informing the quilombolas about the movements of the plantation owners' troops.

In rural areas, there was contact between rebels and freedmen, as well as with enslaved people in the region, and this contact was fundamental to the existence of the quilombo and to the organization of attacks against sugar mills and urban properties. Catucá, therefore, is one of the nineteenth-century quilombos in Brazil that functioned based on a complicity between the quilombolas, the captives on sugar mills, and the local free and freed population, excluding the owners of the means of production. There is evidence of possible alliances between quilombolas and sugar mill owners; this served to protect against violent attacks, looting, and sometimes to save the lives of these owners.

== The end of the Quilombo do Catucá ==
There were several attacks against the Catucá quilombo. However, it was in the second half of the 1820s that the quilombo group suffered its first constant repression. In this scenario, elites, commanders, and generals invested effectively, not completely destroying the quilombolas, but making them less sedentary, more mobile, and sparsely populated. Great leaders of Catucá were killed in these measures, such as João Bamba and José Brabo.

Throughout the 1830s, several procedures contributed to the definitive destruction of the Catucá quilombo. The new judicial organization of the 1830 code, the Justice of the Peace, was tasked with suppressing the quilombos. The creation of positions in the National Guard and Justice of the Peace was important insofar as weapons were distributed by the State for the operations against the group of fugitives.

It is worth noting that one of the strategies adopted by the government to suppress the quilombo was the creation of a colony on land near Catucá. Created between the end of 1829 and mid-1831, the colony known as Colônia Amélia was composed of immigrants of Germanic origin and received support from the provincial government of Pernambuco. The formation of this colony had the main objective of isolating and defeating the quilombo. The colonists burned the forest to produce charcoal, which was their main means of subsistence. With the disappearance of the forest, the formation of the quilombo became more difficult. Therefore, it is clear that the German colonists were also important actors in the process of suppressing the Quilombo do Catucá.

Despite all this organization and manorial structure with resources from the provincial government, many battles were fought with the quilombolas. But it is with the end of the Cabanada, in the second half of the 1830s, that the attacks are very significant, violent and successful against the groups. In this endeavor, only ten fugitives escape, and it is with the death of the leader João Batista along with his son that the Catucá quilombo is considered extinct.

== Archaeology: Regional history through the Catucá ==
Archaeology has played an important role in constructing the history of Brazilian territory, for example in pre-colonial sites. However, for a long time archaeology was reserved for Eurocentric methods of valuing heritage and linked to racialist theories since the beginning of colonial activity in Brazil (FUNARI, 2007) .

The first appreciation of material heritage – initially indigenous – only achieved success through studies by intellectuals inspired by the French humanist movement, such as Paulo Duarte, who carried out work in the mid-20th century on preservation and the creation of legislation for the preservation of archaeological remains. During the period of the military dictatorship, this study was relegated to a secondary priority, but with redemocratization, Public Archaeology gained increasing importance and introduced, for the first time, the study of Afro-Brazilian peoples.

The relationships between the inhabitants of Catucá and the Portuguese, as well as with the surrounding society, are also essential for establishing an awareness of the origin of various customs, myths, and religious traditions of the regional and national culture that are practiced to this day. According to Aline Carvalho and Pedro Paulo Funari, these dialogues must be established to "allow connections to be made between people's daily lives and the historical process described" (CARVALHO, A.; FUNARI, PP, 2007, p. 137).

Therefore, the study of the Quilombo do Catucá can contribute to a better understanding of Pernambuco's past, giving insight, above all, into the "history of the forgotten." This narrative not only studies factual events important to history, but also focuses on the inner workings of society in general: how they produced and used the materials found; whether they were farmers, gatherers, bandits, among others; where their descendants went; and what public policies are necessary to give voice to the remnants, not only of Catucá, but of all Brazilian quilombos.

== Cultural heritage of Catucá ==
The Quilombo do Catucá, in addition to leaving a mark on the history of the region and the struggle for black emancipation, ended up having much of its culture - a mixture of native and African traditions - incorporated into Jurema, with the most striking of these cultural elements being the figure of Malunguinho, who became part of Jurema as one of its masters and who represents strength, leadership and the fight for freedom.

The quilombo leader was a key figure in his people's resistance during that period. As head of the community, his fight was for the dream of freedom for this social group, and his followers used various guerrilla tactics. Today, Malunguinho symbolizes the feeling of local resistance in oral history, articulating a collective memory of the political struggle.

According to Jurema tradition, Malunguinho acquired powers after being saved by the natives when he escaped from the plantation where he was held captive. His contact with the natives and their knowledge of the land is said to have sparked his interest in magical science. His main symbol is a key, which frees captives from any shackles and opens the doors separating the physical world from the spiritual world, as well as another recurring symbol, the seven-pointed star, symbolizing strength and dominion over the cities of Jurema.

The Quilombo Cultural Malunguinho group, an institution that researches and promotes Afro-Indigenous religious practices, has been producing the event "III Kipupa Malunguinho - Coco na mata do Catucá" since 2006, which celebrates regional traditions and the struggle for equality of the quilombola people in the Mata do Catucá. In the political field, the "State Week of Experience and Practice of Afro-Pernambucan Culture" was instituted in Pernambuco from September 12 to 18, "as recognition of the historical rescue of the quilombola leader Malunguinho who died in combat on September 18, 1835".
