= Cinemateca Brasileira =

Cinematheque in São Paulo, Brazil

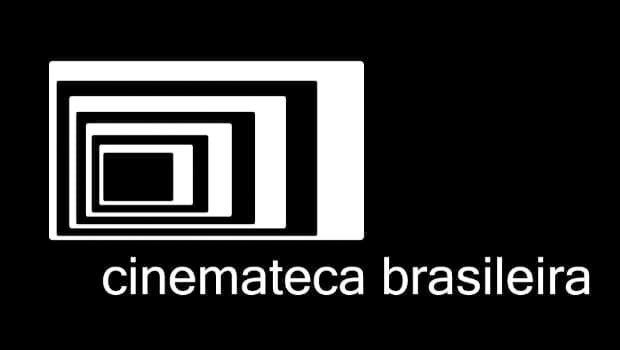

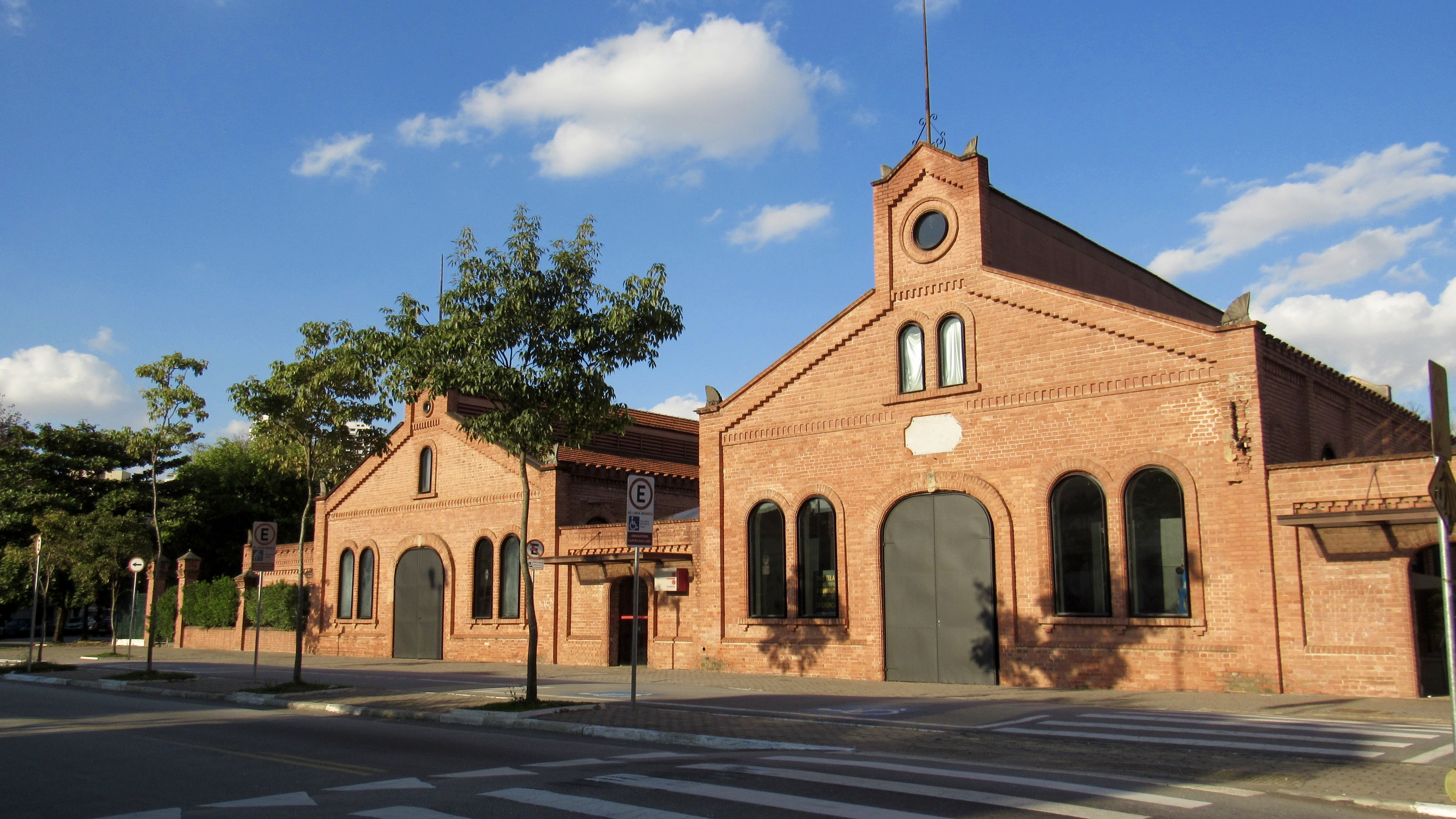
- Established: October 7, 1946
- Location: Largo Senador Raul Cardoso, 207 - Vila Mariana, São Paulo
- Type: cinematheque
- Founder: Paulo Emílio Sales Gomes
- Website: cinemateca.org.br

The Cinemateca Brasileira is the institution responsible for preserving Brazilian audiovisual production. In July 2021, it experienced a major fire.

Since 1940, it has been developing activities around the dissemination and restoration of its collection, with around 250 thousand rolls of films and more than one million documents related to cinema. It is located in Largo Senador Raul Cardoso, São Paulo. The building previously acted as the Old Municipal Slaughterhouse of São Paulo from 1887 to 1927.

It had the largest collection of "moving images" in Latin America and is one of the largest institutions of its kind in the world. It preserved a large part of the nation's cinematographic content and houses the greatest collection of Brazilian cinema, with more than 250,000 rolls of film. These corresponded to 45,000-90,000 titles among the works produced since 1895. The library collection consisted of more than 1,000,000 documents, including censorship certificates, invitations and a huge collection containing around 3,000 scripts and 8,000 movie posters, of which 2.6 are related to national cinema.

In addition, it possessed a large collection of documents including books, magazines, original scripts, photography and posters. Its database offers online access through its website.

== History ==
The Cinemateca Brasileira project was born when Paulo Emílio Salles Gomes, at the time a bachelor of philosophy from the University of São Paulo (USP), emigrated to Europe after escaping his arrest for having participated in the 1935 Communist Uprising. During his stay in France, he worked directly at the Cinémathèque Française, where he discovered the importance of audiovisual work's preservation.

Back in Brazil in 1940, he started his project to spread this cinematographic culture in the country by founding, together with colleagues from USP including Décio de Almeida Prado and Antonio Candido, the first Clube de Cinema de São Paulo (Film Club of São Paulo). The Club proposed to study cinema through projections, conferences, debates and publications. However, the project struggled to grow. Created during the Estado Novo dictatorship period under the government of Getúlio Vargas, the first São Paulo Film Club was closed by the Press and Propaganda Department (DIP), forcing Emílio to operate clandestinely at the residence of Emílio Machado and Lourival Machado from 1941 onwards.

After several attempts to organize film clubs, the creation of the second São Paulo Film Club was made official in 1946, 5 years after the closure of the first. Directed by Almeida Salles, Múcio Porphyrio Ferreira, Rubem Biáfora, Benedito Junqueira Duarte, João de Araujo Nabuco, Lourival Gomes and Tito Batini, the association brought back Emílio's idea and created the Cinemateca Brasileira. Emílio's experience as a researcher at the Cinémathèque Française and with Henri Langlois - the director of the institution - were partially responsible for his commitment to the creation of the Cinemateca. In September 1947, the Club joined the International Federation of Film Societies (IFFS), which provided access to a small collection of films, but the real construction of the film archive began in 1948, following the club's affiliation to the International Federation of Film Archives (FIAF).

In March 1949, the club established an agreement with the then-recently created Modern Art Museum of São Paulo (MAM) for the creation of the Film Library of the Museum of Modern Art of São Paulo. The aim was to strengthen the Cinemateca Brasileira with large exhibitions held in conjunction with other cultural institutions in São Paulo, and to generate spectators with critical capacity. The disbandment of the MAM in search of greater autonomy came in 1956, when the Club became a non-profit civil society of the same name as their archive with the intention of preserving the national and universal cinematographic heritage. In 1984, the Cinemateca was incorporated into the federal government as a department of the Ministry of Education and Culture (MEC, now the Ministry of Education). On August 12, 2003, the Cinemateca Brasileira was incorporated into the Audiovisual Department of the Ministry of Culture, which had split from the MEC in 1985.

The Cinemateca Brasileira was established in 1992 in the Old Municipal Slaughterhouse - a building designed by the architect Alberto Kuhlmann. It was built in 1887 to revive the former slaughterhouse in the lowland of Humaitá, which had existed since 1856 and was listed by CONDEPHAAT (the Council for the Defense of the Historical, Artistic, Archaeological and Touristic Heritage of the State of São Paulo). The Cinemateca makes use of the remaining buildings from the "historic core" of the former slaughterhouse, which have been restored and adapted to its current needs as a documentation center, support areas, restrooms, movie theaters and locations for the hosting of events. In addition to the old buildings, facilities were also added to house film restoration laboratories, warehouses, matrix archives and administrative areas.

Although the Cinemateca has been incorporated by political departments throughout its history, it has been a difficult to maintain. Both public and private institutions have shown resistance in financing the projects and providing capital. The patrons, Assis Chateaubriand and Francisco Matarazzo Sobrinho, didn't see sufficient reason for the Cinemateca Brasileira's existence. The public authorities often refused to finance this parallel distribution and preservation center, giving preference to the commercial film circuit.

Paulo Emílio Salles Gomes wrote about the few resources of the Cinemateca in a 1985 text written about the filmmaker Eisenstein:

The day before yesterday, January 23, the 60th anniversary of the birth of Sergei Mikhailovitch Eisenstein was celebrated in all cinematheques around the world. Since the beginning of last year, Cinemateca Brasileira will project for this occasion a retrospective of the complete work of the Russian filmmaker. However, the penury situation in which the Cinemateca finds itself forced the postponement of the project. This article is the latest in a series that was written in a derisory attempt at compensation.

The Cinemateca Brasileira had one of the largest cinematographic collections in Brazil. Emílio also made the principle behind his concept very clear, as part of a comprehensive project aimed at public education and cultural policies in the country. He highlighted its importance as a revolution in the educational field.

== Destruction ==
Three different fires, one each in 1957, 1969 and 1982, caused damage to the structures and destruction of items in the archived collections at the Cinemateca Brasileira.

On 2 April 2016, the archive reported that a fire had destroyed 500 films.

In August 2020, the British Film Institute reported that the archive was in poor condition.

In May 2021, a writer for art magazine frieze speculated that the archive was about to burn down.

On 29 July 2021, a fire hit the archive.

This accumulated destruction of the Cinemateca Brasileira is in keeping with the destruction of other heritage buildings in Brazil, such as the 2015 fire at the Museum of the Portuguese Language and the 2018 National Museum of Brazil fire.

== See also ==
- List of film archives
