= Octavio Ianni =

Brazilian sociologist

Octavio Ianni (October 13, 1926 – April 4, 2004) was a Brazilian sociologist and professor. Alongside Florestan Fernandes and Fernando Henrique Cardoso, he is one of the representatives of the so-called "Paulista School of Sociology", developed in the Faculty of Philosophy, Languages and Human Sciences of the University of São Paulo.

A sociologist of Marxist formation, he studied social inequalities, the rapid industrialization of Brazil, contemporary imperialism, the new international division of labour, and populism as a tool of mass control.

== Biography ==
Born in Itu into an impoverished family of Italian immigrants, Ianni moved to São Paulo to study at the capital's newly-established University. He had to interrupt his studies due to financial difficulties, but graduated in 1954. He became an assistant to Florestan Fernandes, of whom he also became a disciple, devoting his early academic work to the study of slavery and racism in Brazil.
