= Tapirapé =

Indigenous people of Brazil

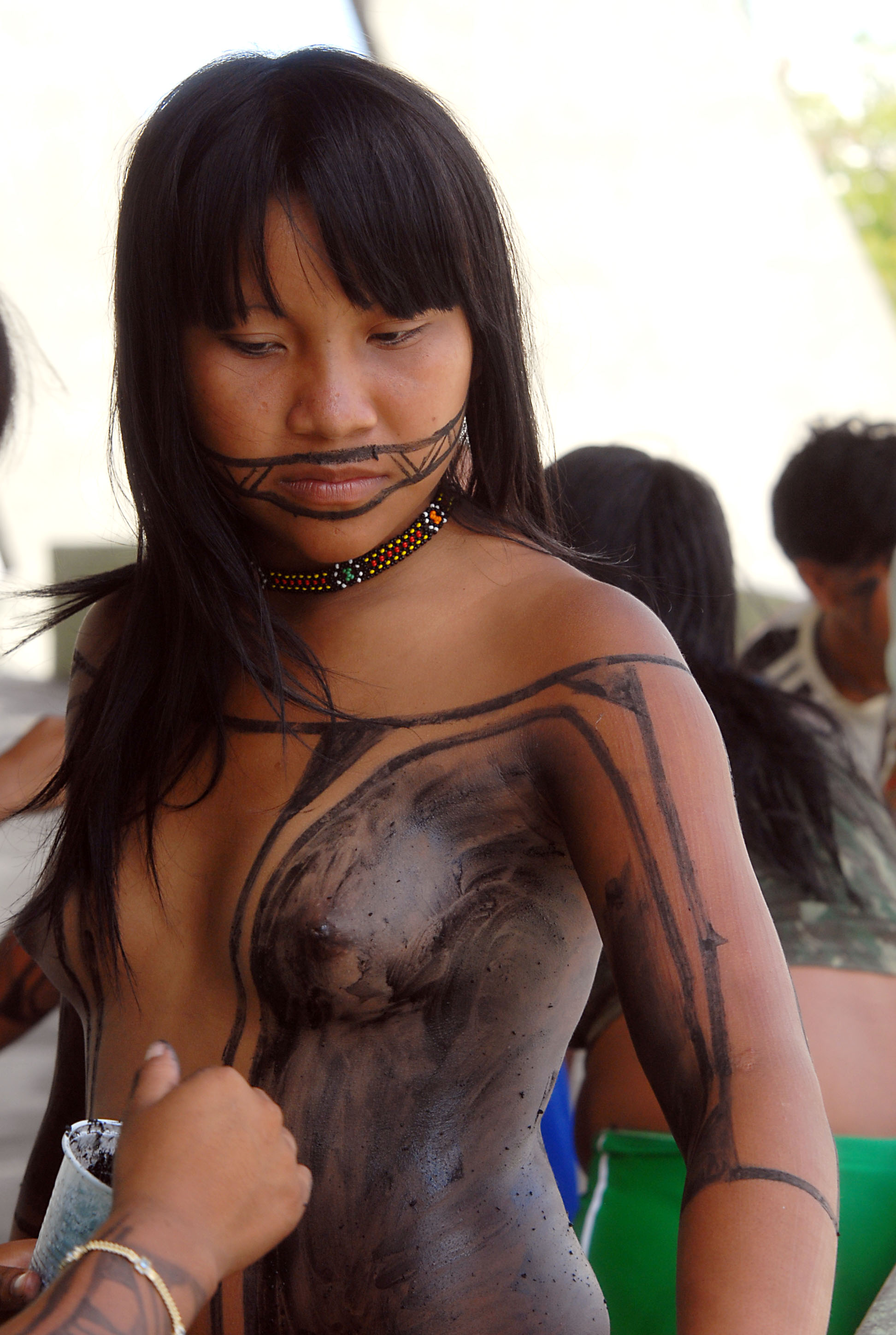
- A Tapirape girl having her body painted

Total population
- 655 (2010)

Regions with significant populations
- Brazil (Mato Grosso, Tocantins)

Languages
- Tapirapé language

Religion
- Animism, Shamanism

Related ethnic groups
- other Tupi-Guaraní peoples

Tapirapé are an Indigenous people of Brazil who survived the European conquest and subsequent colonization, sustaining the majority of their culture and customs. Residing deep in the Amazon rainforest, they had little direct contact with Europeans until around 1910, and that contact was sporadic until the 1950s.

The main reports about the Tapirapé were written by anthropologists Herbert Baldus (1899–1970) and Charles Wagley (1913–1991) and by a group called Little Sisters of Jesus, nuns who have been involved with the Tapirapé since 1953.

== Origins and distribution ==
Wagley conjectured that the Tapirapé descended from the Tupinamba, who populated part of the Brazilian coast in 1500, since both tribes speak the Tupi language. As the Europeans expanded their control, it was theorized that some Tupinamba fled inland, eventually arriving at a segment of tropical forest 11 degrees latitude south of the equator, close to the Amazon River. By 1900, five Tapirapé villages hosted a population of about 1500, spread across 50 and 51 degrees longitude.

Sporadic contact with European Brazilians started in 1910; they brought iron tools and trade goods. European Brazilians infected them with a host of diseases: measles, mumps, and the common cold. American Elizabeth Kilgore Steen spent the night in Tampitawa, one of the five villages, in 1930. She returned with a number of examples of Tapirape material culture, housed at the Museum of the American Indian in Washington, D.C.

By 1939, epidemics and skirmishes with neighboring tribes had reduced the population to just 187 in one village, Tapiitawa; by 1953 only 51 remained. That year, the Little Sisters started their mission among them, and the Brazilian government established a nearby post of the Indian Protection Service. The population started to recover, and, by 1976, had reached 136.

== Economic system ==
The Tapirapé sustained themselves via slash-and-burn horticulture, hunting, and fishing. Patches of forest were cleared and then burned to produce fertile soil planted once or twice before moving to another patch. Each Tapirapé loghouse, hosting four or five families related through maternal links, owned a garden; however, agricultural and hunting products could be shared among people from other houses.

Objects such as tools, hammocks, baskets, strings of beads, and so on were individually owned. Several mechanisms of object distribution were in use. Shamans and midwives were typically paid for their services with goods, which also served to make peace. An annual gift exchange ceremony served to share bounty among the less fortunate. In this ceremony, all men in the village had the opportunity to take a sip of "bad kawi", a drink that produces intense nausea. Wealthy people typically chose not to taste it, but had to donate gifts to those who did. Less fortunate people usually drank in order to receive donations.

== Social organization ==
Each loghouse had a leader; these leaders were not organized in a village council, and did not elect a village chief. Loghouses were located in an oval formation surrounding the takana - a sort of men's club and home of the six Bird Societies, each named after a bird species. Men spend part of the day in the Takana. Membership in a Bird Society is by parental lineage; thus each such society mixed people from several loghouses and served as a medium to integrate the population. Bird Societies organized group hunts and group expeditions to clear gardens. Both men and women belonged to one of a few Feast Groups used for food sharing in the village plaza.

After marriage, men went to live with their wife’s families. Intercourse continued after pregnancy, often with men other than the husband since it was felt that the child would become stronger with more semen. The Tapirapé was one of the few indigenous cultures where adult men could engage in egalitarian homosexual relationships without one of them taking on a woman's role.

Children enjoyed significant liberty; after boys become adolescents, they could start going to the Takana. A coming-of-age ceremony was performed when they became young adults. The Tapirapé exercised a strong population control policy. No couple could bear more than three children, and not more than two of the same sex. This was implemented by immediate infanticide of any extra newborn babies. The reason they gave for this policy was simply economics: given their technology and means of subsistence, they estimated that no man could support and adequately care for more than three children.

== Body aesthetics ==
The Tapirapé wear no clothing in their daily life; however, the men are covered with a small cone attached to the prepuce. Women squatt and sit with their legs together. Both women and men paint their bodies with diverse designs according to age and gender. On special ceremonies and dances, they wear skirts, anklets, and wristbands.

== Religion ==
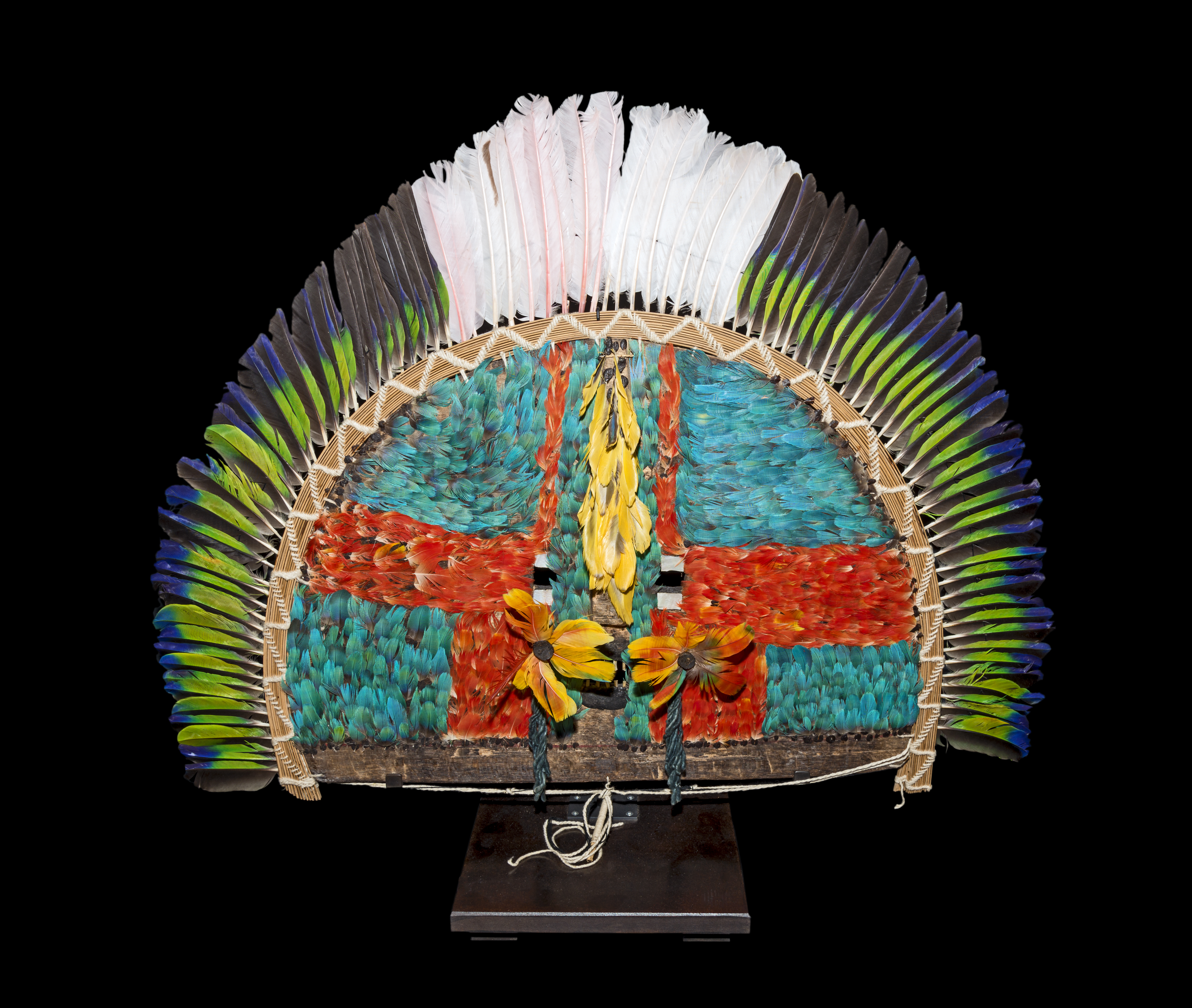
Tapirapé Mask

The Tapirapé religion was based on shamanism. They believed that their shamans could communicate with a variety of spirits, from kindly to unfriendly. Spirits were believed to live in the Takana on a cyclic basis; each “belonged” to a particular Bird Society. When one of the spirits was present, two members of the corresponding Bird Society impersonated and attached themselves to the spirit by wearing a special mask and other pieces of clothing until their whole body was covered; they then went dancing around the village and received good kawi (a manioc drink) from every loghouse.

Shamans were called in to cure disease. The shaman gulped great quantities of tobacco thus producing a sort of trance state. He then blew smoke on the sick person while performing a massage to make a bad spirit or an object leave the body. If several related people died from disease, a shaman would typically be accused of performing sorcery and could be even slaughtered by the kin of the deceased relatives. Shamans were also called in to give the spirit to a child about to be born; the shaman dreamed in the spirit while in a trance state. They purified agricultural and hunting products. Shamans went to Shaman Village after death.

The Tapirapé had a rich mythology. Cultural heroes were previously very powerful Shamans who had performed valuable services.

== 1940 to 1970 ==
Wagley came back to visit the Tapirapé in 1953, 1957, and then in 1965. He reports on the changes brought to Tapirapé culture as the surrounding Brazilian culture encroached on them. Population control by infanticide was a terrible policy in the face of serial epidemics. The Little Sisters were able to end this practice by around 1954. A shaman was killed in 1964 in vengeance for a similar killing that had occurred 20 years before. The assassin was brought to the Brazilian police and spent three months awaiting trial; but after the judge learned of the reason for the murder and considering all the cultural aspects involved, he decided to acquit the murderer and ordered him back to his village.

By 1965, the Tapirapé were concentrated in New Village, created by the Brazilian government to protect them, near a trading post; this increased contact with other peoples and furthered cultural influence. Loghouses shrank in size and some became single-family houses built with mortar. The Takana and the Bird Societies still existed, although the Takana activities now included manufacturing artifacts for trade. Some women started to wear skirts and blouses and men began to wear shorts at least when receiving visitors or trading goods. Brazilian music was beginning to be heard at parties, and alcohol became common despite strong protests from the Little Sisters and the Indian Protection officers. Although the gift system persisted, some men possessed Brazilian bank notes and started to understand their value.

Some land was allocated for the exclusive use of the Tapirapé by the Brazilian government; however powerful land companies were already claiming that land. Wagley cites a speech by a Tapirapé at the First Assembly of Indigenous Chiefs in 1974:

(…) The ranches are surrounding us (…) the land companies are taking away all of our land. Why did the whites want to pacify us? Afterward, what is going to happen to us in the middle of whites working for whites that want to take away our land? Is it meant that the Indians should have nothing and put an end to the Indians? The whites arrived and decided that the Indians could find another place to live. Where should we go? The Indian lives in the place where he knows. If he moves to another place in the riverbanks, in the hills, in the lowlands this is not good.

== See also ==
- Indigenous peoples in Brazil
- List of indigenous peoples
