= David Maybury-Lewis =

British–American anthropologist and activist (1929–2007)

- Born: May 5, 1929 (age 97); Hyderabad, Sindh, British Raj
- Died: December 2, 2007 (aged 78); Cambridge, Massachusetts, US
- Spouse: Pia Henningsen
- Children: 2

Academic background
- Education: Trinity Hall, Cambridge (BA); São Paulo Free School of Sociology and Politics (MA); University of Oxford (DPhil)
- Thesis: The Social Organisation of a Central Brazilian Tribe: The Akwẽ-Shavante (1960)
- Doctoral advisor: Rodney Needham
- Other advisor: Herbert Baldus

Academic work
- Discipline: Anthropology
- School or tradition: Structural anthropology
- Institutions: Harvard University (1960–2004)
- Doctoral students: Terence Turner

David Henry Peter Maybury-Lewis (5 May 1929 – 2 December 2007) was an anthropologist, ethnologist of lowland South America, Harvard University academic, and activist for indigenous peoples' human rights.

== Biography ==
Born in Hyderabad, Sindh (now in Pakistan), to a hydraulic engineer in the British Civil Service, Maybury-Lewis attended The King's School, Canterbury, during the early years of World War II. He served as an officer with the West Yorkshire Regiment in Vienna from 1948 to 1949. He then studied modern languages at Trinity Hall, Cambridge, graduating in 1952. He eventually acquired fluency in nine languages, including two indigenous tongues of the Brazilian Amazon, Xavante and Xerénte.

In 1954, he traveled to Brazil, where he taught English language and literature at the Cultura Inglesa school and studied for a master's degree in social sciences at the Free School of Sociology and Politics (ELSPSP, loosely associated with the University of São Paulo). At ELSPSP, he focused on indigenous cultures under the guidance of Herbert Baldus and took classes with historian Sérgio Buarque de Holanda. From 1955 to 1958, he carried out anthropological fieldwork initially among the Xerente and then among the Xavante in Mato Grosso, accompanied by his wife and infant son. In 1960, he received a Doctor of Philosophy degree in anthropology from the University of Oxford with a thesis on The Social Organisation of a Central Brazilian Tribe: The Akwẽ-Shavante, supervised by Rodney Needham.

In 1960, he joined the Harvard Faculty of Arts and Sciences, initially as an instructor in social anthropology. He was promoted to assistant professor in 1961, and appointed Edward C. Henderson Professor of Anthropology in 1969. He led Harvard's collaboration with the National Museum of Brazil in the Harvard–Central Brazil Project that ran from 1962 to 1967, and co-founded the graduate degree programme in anthropology at the National Museum during the 1960s with Roberto Cardoso de Oliveira. He chaired Harvard's department of anthropology from 1973 to 1981, and curated South American Ethnology at the university's Peabody Museum of Archaeology and Ethnology from 1966 until his retirement in 2004.

In 1972, he and his wife Pia, with help from sociologist Orlando Patterson and anthropologist Evon Vogt, co-founded Cultural Survival, a Cambridge, Massachusetts-based advocacy and documentation organization devoted to "promoting the rights, voices and visions of indigenous peoples." He was president of the non-profit until his death, receiving the American Anthropological Association's Franz Boas Award for Exemplary Service to Anthropology in 1988 jointly with his wife for their advocacy efforts. He undertook reporting activities on behalf of Cultural Survival. In 1978, he assessed the situation of the indigenous peoples of Paraguay at the request of USAID. He criticised World Bank's funding of Indonesia's transmigration program before the United States Senate Committee on Appropriations in 1985, and testified about World Bank's alleged failure to implement its guidelines on the protection of indigenous peoples and the environment before the United States Senate Committee on Foreign Relations in 1986. He wrote articles to document the Guatemalan genocide against the Mayans in 1981–1983, the 1983–1985 famine in Ethiopia, and the conflict between the Miskito and the Sandinista government in Nicaragua during the 1980s.

In 1992, Maybury-Lewis became the host of the documentary television series Millennium: Tribal Wisdom and the Modern World.

== Awards ==
- Former president of the American Ethnological Society
- Elected fellow of the American Academy of Arts and Sciences, in 1977
- Grand Cross of the Brazilian Order of Scientific Merit, Brazil's highest academic honor, in 1997
- Anders Retzius gold medal of the Swedish Society for Anthropology and Geography, in 1998

== Selected works ==
- The Savage and the Innocent (1965; reprinted 2000) ISBN 0-8070-4685-X
- Akwẽ-Shavante Society (1967; new preface 1974) ISBN 0-19-519729-1
- Dialectical Societies: The Gê and Bororo of Central Brazil (edited, 1979) ISBN 0-674-20285-6
- Prospects for Plural Societies: 1982 Proceedings of the American Ethnological Society (edited, 1984) ISBN 0-942976-04-5
- The Attraction of Opposites: Thought and Society in the Dualistic Mode (edited, with Uri Almagor, 1989) ISBN 0-472-08086-5
- Millennium: Tribal Wisdom and the Modern World (1992) ISBN 0-670-82935-8
- Indigenous Peoples, Ethnic Groups, and the State (1997; 2nd edn. 2002) ISBN 0-205-33746-5
- The Politics of Ethnicity: Indigenous Peoples in Latin American States (edited, 2002) ISBN 0-674-00964-9

== Sources ==
- Lamphere, Louise (2009), "David Maybury-Lewis and Cultural Survival: Providing a Model for Public Anthropology, Advocacy, and Collaboration", Anthropological Quarterly, 82 (4): 1049–1054, JSTOR 20638681
- Prins, Harald E.L.; Graham, Laura (2008), "Pioneer in Brazilian Ethnography and Indigenous Rights Advocacy: David Maybury-Lewis (1929–2007)", Tipití, 6 (1–2): 115–122, ISSN 1545-4703
- Yalman, Nur (2009), "David Maybury-Lewis (1929–2007)", American Anthropologist, 111 (2): 259–261, doi:10.1111/j.1548-1433.2009.01126.x
