= Clima =

Cultural magazine in Brazil (1941–1944)

- Categories: Cultural magazine
- Frequency: Monthly
- Founder: Grupo Clima
- First issue: May 1941
- Final issue: 1944
- Country: Brazil
- Based in: São Paulo
- Language: Portuguese

Clima (English: 'Climate') was a cultural magazine published in São Paulo, Brazil. Ismail Xavier argues that although it existed for a brief period from 1941 to 1944, the magazine significantly influenced cultural criticism in Brazil.

== History and profile ==
Clima was established in 1941, and the first issue appeared in May that year. The founders were the Brazilian intellectuals, who were called the Grupo Clima. The magazine was published on a monthly basis. One of the founders was Paulo Emilio Salles Gomes. The others included Antonio Candido, Décio de Almeida Prado, Gilda de Mello e Souza, Ruy Coelho and Lourival Gomes Machado. Antonio Candido also worked for the magazine as a literary critic. Clima existed until 1944.
