= Marilena de Souza Chaui =

Brazilian philosopher

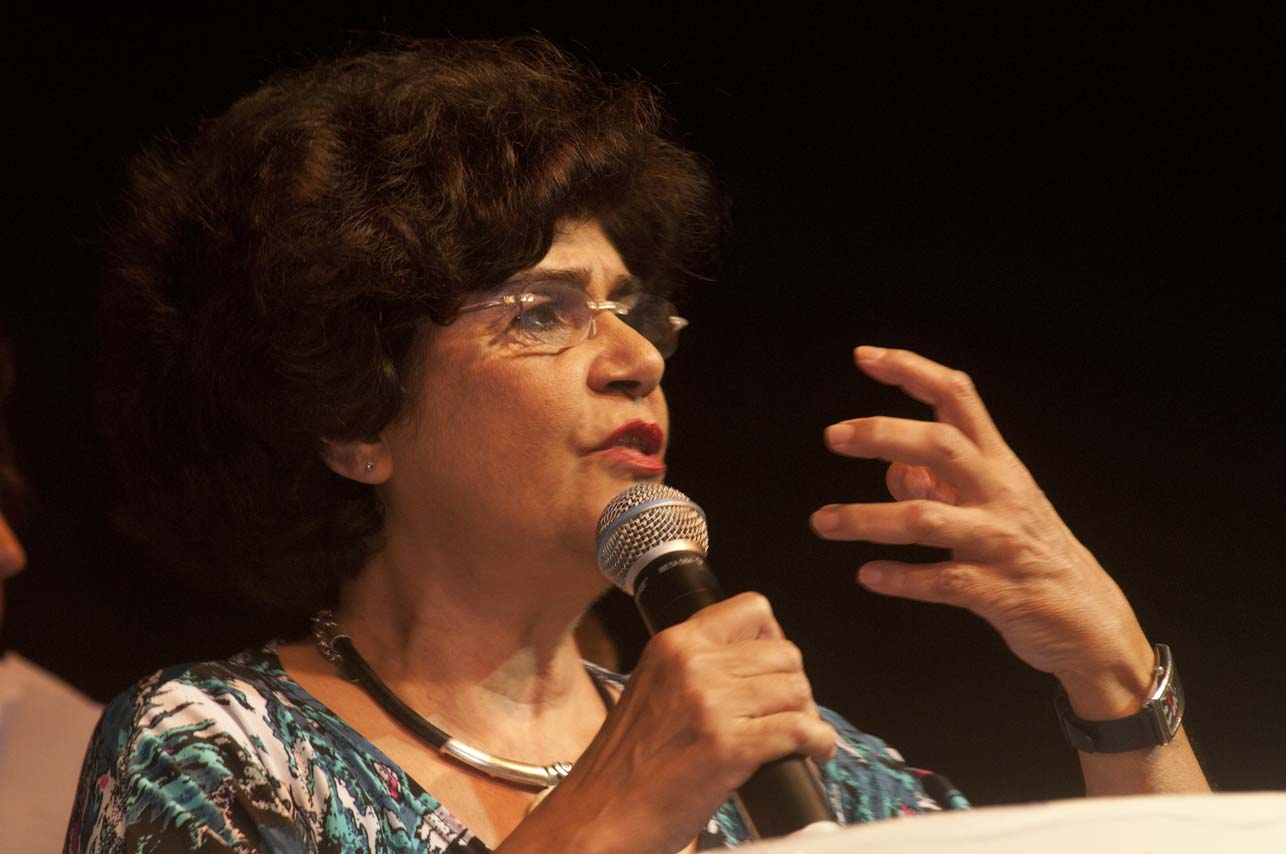
- Chaui in 2010

Personal details
- Born: September 4, 1941 (age 84) Pindorama, State of Sao Paulo
- Profession: philosopher, professor

Marilena de Souza Chaui (born September 4, 1941) is a Brazilian philosopher and Professor of Modern Philosophy in the University of São Paulo. She is a scholar of Baruch Spinoza and Maurice Merleau-Ponty. Chaui is one of the founding members of Workers' Party and an assiduous critic of the capitalist model.

== Life ==
Chaui is a Professor of Political Philosophy and History of Modern Philosophy in the University of São Paulo, having been awarded a master's degree in 1967, and received her doctorate in 1971 with the essay "Introduction to Reading Spinoza", under the guidance of Professor Gilda de Mello e Souza Rocha. In 1977, she taught Philosophy in the University of São Paulo.

Her book What is Ideology? was selected by the Ministry of Education and Culture of Brazil as a mandatory textbook in public schools, becoming a bestseller with over a hundred thousand copies sold. Chaui had served as Municipal Secretary of Culture of São Paulo, from 1989 to 1992, during the administration of Luiza Erundina (1988-1992). In 2013, during the release of the book "10 Years of Post-Liberal Government in Brasil: Lula and Dilma"

== Family ==
Chaui is the daughter of the journalist Nicholas Alberto Chaui, of Arabic origin, and teacher Laura de Souza Chaui. She was married to the journalist José Augusto de Mattos Berlinck, with whom she had two children - José Guilherme and Luciana. She is currently married to Michael Hall, a historian and professor at the State University of Campinas (UNICAMP).

== Partial bibliography ==
She is the author of, among others,

- O que é Ideologia? (What is Ideology?)
- Escritos sobre a Universidade (Writings on University)
- Cultura e Democracia: o discurso competente e outras falas (Culture and Democracy: The competent speech and other speeches)
- Da realidade sem mistério ao mistério do mundo: Espinosa (Spinoza, Voltaire e Merleau-Ponty (From the Reality without mysteries to the Mystery of the World: Spinoza, Voltaire and Merleau-Ponty))
- A nervura do real: Imanência e Liberdade em Espinosa (The rib of the real: Immanence and Freedom in Spinoza)
- Espinosa e Política em Espinosa (Spinoza and Politics in Spinoza)
- Repressão Sexual (Sexual repression)
- Brasil: Mito Fundador e Sociedade Autoritária (Brazil: Founding Myth and Authoritarian Society)
- Introdução à História da Filosofia (Introduction to the History of Philosophy)
- Convite à Filosofia (Invitation to Philosophy)
- Cidadania Cultural (Cultural citizenship)
- Simulacro e poder (Simulacrum and power)
