= Elizabeth Kilgore Steen =

American explorer, social anthropologist and author (1886-1938)

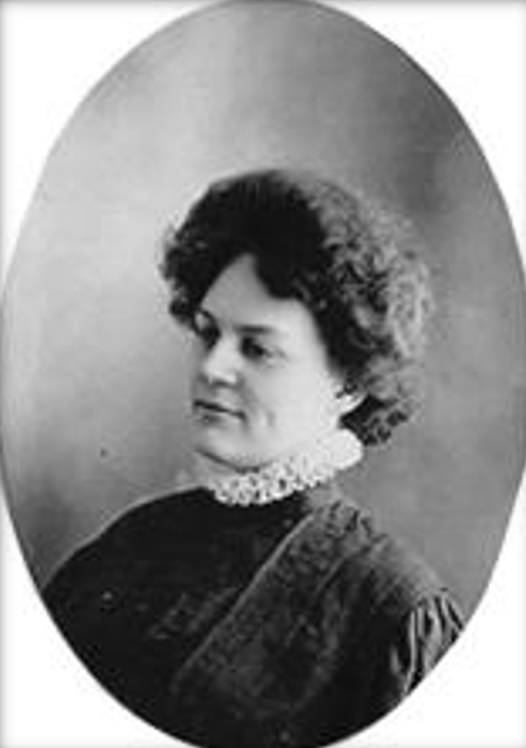
- Born: April 21, 1886; Jackson Township, Benton County, Iowa
- Died: July 12, 1938 (aged 52); Loma Linda, California
- Other name: Bessie Steen
- Education: Emanuel Missionary College, Columbia University
- Occupations: explorer, social anthropologist, author
- Known for: Explorations into Brazilian interior

Elizabeth Kilgore "Bessie" Steen (April 21, 1886 – July 12, 1938), was an American teacher, explorer, social anthropologist and author. She made three exploratory trips to Brazil and became known as the "first white woman to enter the remote Matto Grosso area in interior Brazil."

== Biography ==
Elizabeth was one of three children born in Jackson Township, Iowa to Samuel Britton Steen (1845–1905) and nurse Emma Cooper (1863–1927). At 14, the family moved to Knoxville, Iowa.

In 1905 she graduated from high school and began her teaching career at Old English Settlement, near Knoxville. Elizabeth went on to earn her Bachelor of Arts degree from Emanuel Missionary College (later Andrews University) in Berrien Springs, Michigan. In 1926 she finished a master's degree from Columbia University in New York City. In her quest to study art, she travelled to England, France, Germany and Austria.

With her keen interest in travel and art, she went to New Mexico to study American indigenous drawings, which sparked her lifelong devotion to anthropology. In 1929 Elizabeth was accepted into the anthropology department at the University of California as a PhD candidate, although it is unclear whether she completed her doctoral studies. She also received training from the Pratt Institute in Brooklyn, New York.

== Expeditions to Brazil ==
In 1927, Steen was a teacher at a high school in San Jose, California. Her brother Thomas W. Steen had moved to Brazil several years earlier and was teaching at a college in Sao Paulo. She visited her brother in 1927 and took that opportunity to meet some indigenous people, including the Aimoré (also called Aymore, Aimboré, Botocudo).

In 1930, she traveled back to Brazil after beginning her anthropology studies. It was reported in The New York Times that "she hoped to gather material for her thesis at the University of California, and had financed the expedition herself."

Before Steen's departure in February 1930, newspapers described her as a teacher who was supposed to find "the lost tribe" in the Amazon, the Tapiraré people. Steen told reporters that the tribe had been driven away 20 years earlier by the Karajá (also spelled Carajá). Her expedition in Brazil included personnel from the Brazilian Indian Protection Service and native guides from various indigenous groups, as well as a soldier. After arriving in South American, they traveled along the Araguaia River (Rio Araguaia), a tributary of the Tocantins River in central Brazil that flows through the states of Mato Grosso, Goiás, Tocantins and Pará. According to one press report, "Miss Steen said she had to do most of the paddling herself." Once the expedition reached the Tapiraré people, they stayed in the village for one night. But their sleeping quarters were entered by villagers who were seemingly intent on kidnapping Steen and murdering the guide, who was a Colonel in the Brazilian Army, "but were frustrated by the 'high magic' of a flashlight which the Colonel turned on in their faces." The next day, "the Colonel forced her to leave the village because he feared the flashlight trick would not work again." By December 1930, Steen had returned safely back to Rio de Janeiro.

She collected trunks of artifacts during her explorations and took photographs that now reside in the National Museum of the American Indian, Washington, DC. Some artifacts are also held in Sweden at the Museum of World Culture in Gothenburg.

Elizabeth Steen died in Loma Linda, California on July 12, 1938 at 52.

== Author ==
Steen wrote a children's book, Red Jungle Boy, Illustrated with her own three-color artwork, which was published in 1937 and included a foreword by anthropologist Franz Boas.
