= Pedro Paulo Funari =

Brazilian historian

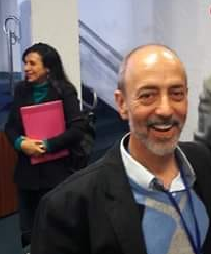
Funari in 2018.

Pedro Paulo Abreu Funari (born 1959) is a Brazilian archaeologist, historian, and professor. Considered one of Brazil's major scholars of Classical antiquity and historical archaeology, he has also written on cultural heritage and the history of Indigenous people of Brazil. He leads a research group within the National Council for Scientific and Technological Development.

== Biography ==
Born in São Paulo into a modest family, he studied history at the Faculty of Philosophy, Languages and Human Sciences of the University of São Paulo, graduating in 1981. In 1986, he earned a master's degree in social anthropology from the University of São Paulo, and in 1990 he obtained a doctorate in archaeology under Haiganuch Sarian from the same university with a thesis titled Padrões de consumo do azeite bético na Bretanha Romana. He completed postdoctoral studies at Illinois State University in 1992.

He taught at São Paulo State University from 1986 to 1992, and was appointed professor at the State University of Campinas in 1992, later becoming full professor of history. He was a distinguished lecturer at Stanford University. Funari was a pioneer in the archaeological study of the Palmares quilombo and coordinated the book As religiões que o mundo esqueceu, which treats the theme of extinct religions.

== Works ==
- Turismo e patrimônio cultural (2001)
- Grécia e Roma (2002)
- Pré-história do Brasil (2002)
- A vida quotidiana na Roma Antiga (2004)
- Palmares, ontem e hoje (2005)
- Arqueologia (2006)
- Patrimônio histórico e cultural (2006)
