= Cultural Survival =

American nonprofit organization

- Founded: 1972; 54 years ago
- Type: Non-governmental organization
- Purpose: Indigenous rights
- Location: Cambridge, Massachusetts, United States
- Region served: Worldwide
- Website: culturalsurvival.org

Cultural Survival is an Indigenous-led nonprofit organization (501(c)(3)), based in Cambridge, Massachusetts, United States, that advocates for the rights of Indigenous Peoples around the world. Founded in 1972, the organization supports Indigenous communities in achieving self-determination, preserving their cultures, languages, and traditional knowledge, and strengthening political and environmental resilience. As of 2025, Cultural Survival holds a four-star rating from Charity Navigator.

== Mission and Vision ==
Cultural Survival’s mission is to "advocate for Indigenous Peoples' rights and supports Indigenous communities’ self-determination, cultures and political resilience." Cultural Survival envisions "a future that respects and honors Indigenous Peoples' inherent rights and dynamic cultures, deeply and richly interwoven in lands, languages, spiritual traditions, and artistic expression, rooted in self-determination and self-governance."

== History ==
Founded by David Maybury-Lewis, Evon Zartman Vogt, and Orlando Patterson —professors at Harvard University — and Pia Maybury‑Lewis (wife of David Maybury-Lewis), the organization originated in response to their fieldwork among the Xerente and Xavante peoples in Brazil during the 1950s and 60s. Their experiences observing the threats posed by Amazonian development inspired the creation of a global advocacy organization for Indigenous human rights.

Cultural Survival’s first office opened on March 2, 1972, on the fifth floor of Harvard’s Peabody Museum of Archaeology and Ethnology. Early leadership included David Maybury‑Lewis as President, Orlando Patterson as Treasurer, Evon Z. Vogt Jr. as Clerk, and Pia Maybury‑Lewis as co-founder. Today, its main office is located at 2067 Massachusetts Avenue, Cambridge, on Massachusett land.

== Indigenous Leadership ==
The organization became Indigenous‑led in 2011 when Suzanne Benally (Navajo and Santa Clara Tewa) was appointed Executive Director, becoming its first Indigenous leader. She was succeeded in 2019 by Galina Angarova (Buryat), and the current Executive Director, Aimee Roberson (Choctaw & Chickasaw), assumed the role in July 2024.

== Programs ==
Cultural Survival executes a holistic strategy comprising grantmaking, capacity building, advocacy, Indigenous communications, and Cultural Survival Bazaars. Programmatic priorities include climate change solutions, land rights and livelihoods, cultural and language revitalization, and Indigenous community media. A cross-cutting focus is placed on Indigenous women and youth.

=== Grantmaking ===
- Keepers of the Earth Fund (KOEF): This Indigenous-led fund provides small grants—up to $12,000—to Indigenous organizations, collectives, and traditional governments. Projects address a range of priorities, including women and youth leadership, land stewardship, climate resilience, biodiversity, food sovereignty, and language revitalization.
- Indigenous Community Media Fund: This fund supports Indigenous community radio stations and media initiatives. Grants range from $1,500 to $12,000 to strengthen broadcasting infrastructure, organizational capacity, and advocacy efforts.

=== Capacity Building ===
- Cultural Survival offers fellowships, training programs, community exchanges, and mentorship opportunities for Indigenous youth and organizations. It also facilitates participation in international conferences and hosts Indigenous writers and artists through its residency programs.

=== Advocacy ===
- The organization works alongside Indigenous communities to support their efforts in asserting their rights at national and international levels. It has held consultative status with the UN Economic and Social Council (ECOSOC) since 2005 and contributes to forums such as the UN Permanent Forum on Indigenous Issues (UNPFII), the Expert Mechanism on the Rights of Indigenous Peoples (EMRIP), and climate conventions like UNFCCC and CBD.

=== Communications ===
- Cultural Survival publishes Cultural Survival Quarterly, a magazine founded in 1976, which features global Indigenous issues. The organization also runs Indigenous Rights Radio, produces podcasts and articles, and engages audiences through social media and public webinars.

=== Cultural Survival Bazaar ===
- Since 1982, Cultural Survival has hosted Cultural Survival Bazaars, cultural events that provide Indigenous artisans and cooperatives a platform to sell crafts, art, clothing, and other handmade goods. Held twice yearly in the New England region, these bazaars also feature live music, dance, and traditional craft demonstrations, promoting cultural exchange and economic opportunity.

== See also ==
- Friends of Peoples Close to Nature
- Survival International
