= Virgínia Leone Bicudo =

Brazilian sociologist

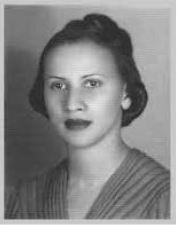
- Born: November 21, 1910; São Paulo, Brazil
- Died: 2003 (aged 92–93)
- Education: Escola Livre de Sociologia e Política
- Occupations: Sociologist, psychoanalyst
- Known for: First non-physician to be recognized as a psychoanalyst in Brazil

Virgínia Leone Bicudo (November 21, 1910 – 2003) was a Brazilian sociologist and psychoanalyst, the first non-physician to be recognized as a psychoanalyst, becoming essential for the consolidation and institutionalization of psychoanalysis in Brazil. In the field of sociology, she pioneered the study of race relations as the theme of her master's thesis in 1945.

== Early life ==
Virgínia was born in São Paulo in 1910. She was the daughter of Italian immigrant Giovanna Leone and the descendant of enslaved Black men Theophilo Bicudo. Giovanna was the babysitter of the raised daughter of colonel and senator Bento Augusto de Almeida Bicudo, Theophilo's godfather. With the support of Colonel Bicudo, Theophilo became an employee of the Correios and Telégrafos, and later rose in the institution until he reached the position of director of a São Paulo branch.

Virgínia studied at the Escola Normal Caetano de Campos, in the Luz neighborhood. After the Normal School, she took a course on sanitary education at the Hygiene Institute of São Paulo, in 1932. After graduating, she became an employee of the School Health Service Board of the Education Department, teaching hygiene classes in schools in the state of São Paulo, where she became interested in sociology. She started a course in social sciences at the Escola Livre de Sociologia e Política in 1936.

== Sociologist ==
She received her bachelor's degree in Political and Social Sciences from the Escola Livre de Sociologia e Política on March 1, 1939.

In 1945 she earned a master's degree in sociology from the Escola Livre de Sociologia e Política, defending the dissertation Estudo de atitudes raciais de pretos e mulatos em São Paulo, the first post-graduate work in Social Sciences in Brazil to deal with race relations. Her dissertation was recently republished and has as merit the refusal of racial formulations of biological nature to think of race as a social category.

Virgínia Leone Bicudo verified that racial discrimination in Brazil was not only present in social relations, but also acquired a specific character: it configured a prejudice that minimized direct confrontation and prevented the development of consciousness about discrimination. Her study defends the thesis that the criterion of appearance based on whitening would constitute the main determinant of the opportunities for social ascension for Blacks in Brazil.

She was a participant of the UNESCO Project in Brazil, coordinated by Roger Bastide and Florestan Fernandes, writing the report "Attitudes of the students of the school groups in relation to the color of their colleagues", published in 1953, in the periodical Anhembi.

She was one of the first black female university professors in Brazil, teaching at the University of São Paulo, Santa Casa, and the Free School of Sociology and Politics.

== Psychoanalyst ==
Virgínia Bicudo was the first psychoanalyst without medical training in Brazil. She began her analysis with Dr. Adelheid Lucy Koch, the first analyst accredited by the International Psychoanalytical Association (IPA) in Brazil. In 1937, she applied to become a member of the Brazilian Society of Psychoanalysis of São Paulo (SBPSP), being approved as an effective member in 1945. In 1962, she was elected president of the second board of the Psychoanalysis Institute, a position she would hold until 1975.

In 1970, she began to analyze and teach a group of six psychiatrists in Brasília (Caiuby de Azevedo Marques Trench, Humberto Haydt de Souza Mello, Ronaldo Mendes de Oliveira Castro, Tito Nícias Rodrigues Teixeira da Silva and Luiz Meyer). The group was then taken over by the Psychoanalytic Society of São Paulo, becoming the first group of the current Psychoanalytic Society of Brasília.

Virgínia Bicudo worked in several ways for the diffusion of psychoanalysis in Brazil. She wrote columns in the press defending her ideas on the social function of the psychoanalyst and took part in the foundation of the Psychoanalysis Society of Brasilia. She also collaborated in the creation of the Revista Brasileira de Psicanálise (RBP). In a 2004 editorial, this journal referred to her as "one of the first Brazilian psychoanalysts with international publications".

== Books ==
- BICUDO, Virgínia Leone. Nosso Mundo Mental. São Paulo: Instituição Brasileira de Difusão Cultural, 1956.
- BICUDO, Virgínia Leone. Comunicação não-verbal como expressão de onipotência e onisciência. Revista Brasileira de Psicanálise, São Paulo, vol.37, n.4, 983–992, 2003.

== Bibliography ==
- Tavolaro, Lília. «Virginia Leone Bicudo. Atitudes raciais de pretos e mulatos em São Paulo. Edição organizada por Marcos Chor Maio. São Paulo, Editora Sociologia e Política, 2010, 192 pp.» (PDF). Tempo Social. Consultado em 4 de novembro de 2015
- França, João Baptista N. F. (2003). «Editorial: Psicanálise, ontem e hoje». Revista Brasileira de Psicanálise. 37 (4). Consultado em 1 de outubro de 2012}}
- "Comunicação não-verbal como expressão de onipotência e omnisciência", artigo de Virgínia Bicudo na RBP
