= Gioconda Mussolini =

Brazilian anthropologist (1913–1969)

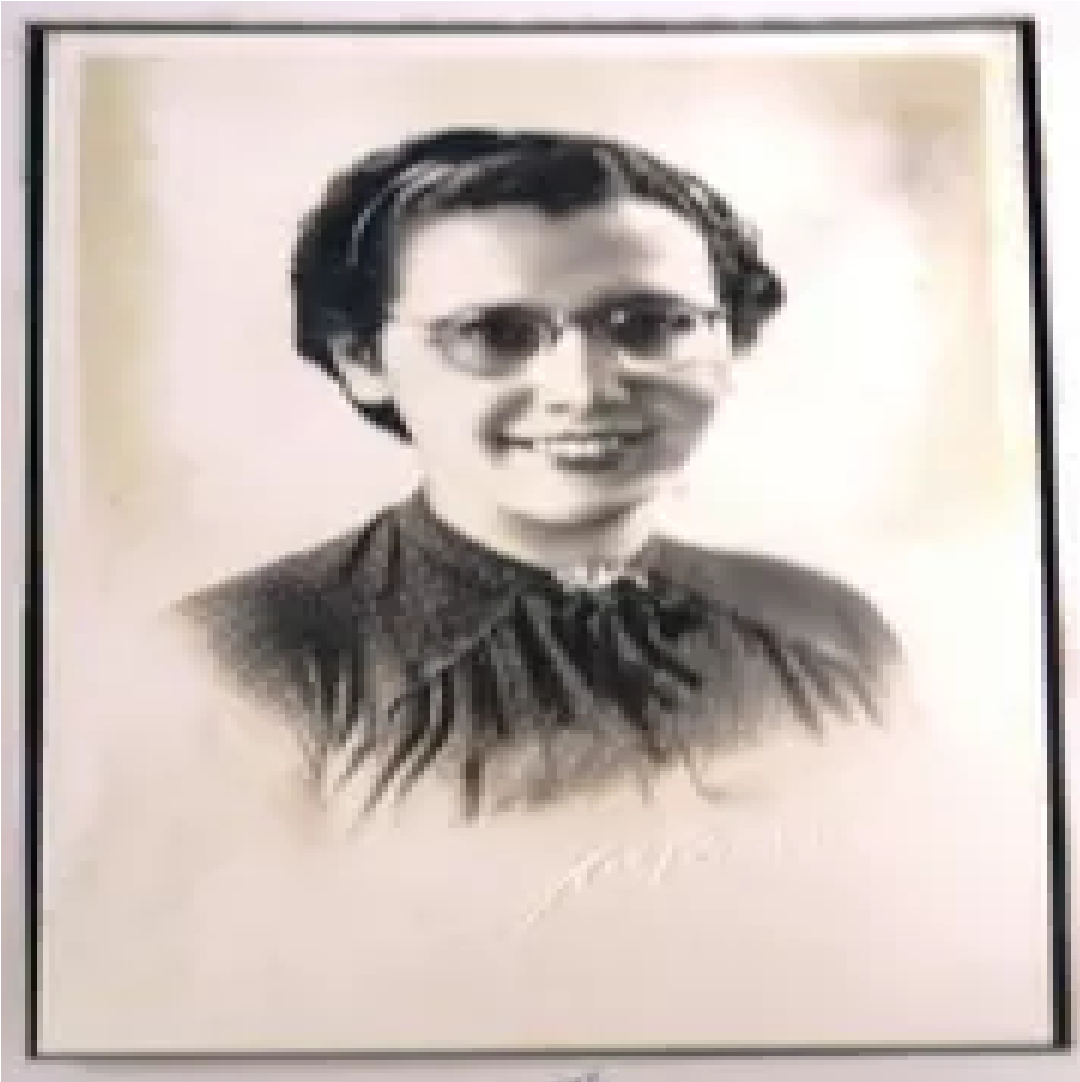
Gioconda Mussolini

Gioconda Mussolini (15 November 1913 – 29 May 1969) was a Brazilian anthropologist. She was a professor at the University of São Paulo, where she taught sociology from 1938 and anthropology from 1944. In the postwar period, she was one of the first women along with Egon Schaden to receive a doctoral degree in anthropology in Brazil.

== Biography ==
Born in the Bom Retiro neighborhood, in São Paulo, Brazil, on 15 November 1913, Gioconda Mussolini was the third of seven daughters of Italian immigrant Umberto Mussolini, who arrived in Brazil from Veneto in 1888, and his Brazilian wife Adalgisa Vieiga. She attended primary school at Regente Feijó and São Paulo between 1922 and 1926. In 1929, she enrolled at the Padre Anchieta Normal School, where she graduated as a primary school teacher in 1931. As part of this training, between 1933 and 1934, she further completed a continuing education program for primary school teachers at Caetano de Campos Institute of Education in Praça da República.

She later started her professional career as a school teacher and briefly taught in the public school system in the rural district of Jacupiranga. In 1935, she was admitted at the newly created school of philosophy, sciences and letters at the University of São Paulo which offered improvement course in social sciences for the primary school teachers.

After the completion of the course in 1937, she was invited to join as a research assistant at the Chair of Sociology, then chaired by Paul Arbousse Bastide, a French philosopher. In 1938, she began in teaching of sociology at the University of São Paulo. Between 1941 and 1945, she also studied for a master's degree in anthropology at the school of sociology and politics, University of São Paulo under the guidance of Herbert Baldus, a German anthropologist. In 1944, a year before obtaining her master's degree in anthropology, she was appointed as the Chair of anthropology, created in 1941 and earlier headed by Emilio Willems, a German ethnologist.

She died in São Paulo on May 28, 1969.
