= Emilio Willems =

German sociologist and anthropologist (1905–1997)

- Born: 18 August 1905; Cologne, German Empire
- Died: 19 November 1997 (aged 92); Nashville, Tennessee, U.S.
- Education: University of Cologne; University of Berlin
- Occupations: Sociologist, anthropologist, professor

Emilo or Emilio Willems (18 August 1905 – 19 November 1997) was a German sociologist and anthropologist based in Brazil and, later on, in the United States.

During the 1940s, Willems made significant contributions to the institutionalization of sociological and anthropologic studies in Brazil. In 1941, at the invite of Fernando de Azevedo, Willems was the first anthropology lecturer at the University of São Paulo, where his classes would become obligatory for students of the social sciences. He played a major role in the graduation of the first generations of Brazilian anthropologists and sociologists.

== Biography ==
Willems was born on 18 August 1905 in a suburb of the city of Cologne, in what was then the German Empire, into a Catholic family. He attended the elite Gynnasium Tricoronato of Cologne, where he studied Latin, Greek, and classic literature. In 1924, he began, his studies in economic sciences at the University of Cologne, and continued on to the University of Berlin. During his time at the latter, he came into contact with the German school of sociology that, at the time, contained influences from the ideas of Ernst Troeltsch, Max Weber, Werner Sombart, Wilhelm Dilthey, and Georg Simmel, among others. Along with these influences, he attended classes taught by ethnologists Alfred Vierkandt and Richard Thurnwald.

In 1931, as the Nazi Party came into power, Willems emigrated to Brazil, moving to the city of Brusque in Santa Catarina state, where he lectured at a Catholic seminary. In 1936, he was transferred to São Paulo, where he began to lecture in sociology at the Escola de Sociologia e Política de São Paulo, becoming the colleague of, among others, Donald Pierson and Herbert Baldus. Starting in 1941, he became a full time professor of anthropology at the Faculty of Philosophy, Sciences, and Letters at the University of São Paulo. While there, he taught sociology classes, the discipline in which he would obtain his ability to teach doctorate courses in 1937.

At USP, where he had as assistants Egon Schaden and Gioconda Mussolini, he contributed to the graduation of many Brazilian social scientists. He carried out various relevant research projects in rural Brazil, but the two main ones were conducted in Cunha (SP), which resulted in the monograph Uma vila brasileira — tradição e mudança (São Paulo: Difusão Européia do Livro, 1961) and at Ilha de Búzios, in the archipalego of Ilhabela, in the northern coast of São Paulo. This research study resulted in the book Buzios Island: a Caiçara Community in Southern Brazil, published in Washington DC in 1952, in collaboration with Mussolini. In Brazil, Willems also published Aculturação dos alemães no Brasil (São Paulo, Editora Nacional, 1946) and, in partnership with Baldus, the Dicionário de etnologia, e sociologia (São Paulo, Editora Nacional, 1939), along with Dicionário de sociologia (Porto Alegre, Editora Globo, 1950).

In 1949, Willems moved to the United States, going on to lecture at Vanderbilt University, in Nashville, Tennessee. There, he was a member of the American Anthropological Association, and would go on to publish various books, among them Followers of the New Faith: Culture Change and the Rise of Protestantism in Brazil and Chile (1967), Latin American Culture: An Anthropological Synthesis (1975), and A Way of Life and Death: Three Centuries of Prussian-German Militarism (1986).

Willems' importance to Brazilian anthropology is vast, seen by the fact that he had been the first lecturer on the subject at USP, where he taught dozens of anthropologists. In particular, he has also become renowned for his theoretical contributions and empirical contributions to the theme of acculturation, along with his participation in "community studies".

== Death ==
Willems died on 19 November 1997 in Nashville at 92 years old.
