= Donald Pierson =

American sociologist

- Born: September 8, 1900; Kansas, U.S.
- Died: October 13, 1995 (aged 95); Florida, U.S.
- Education: University of Chicago (PhD)
- Occupations: Sociologist, professor

Donald Pierson (September 8, 1900 – October 13, 1995) was an American sociologist and professor. A long time faculty member and researcher at the Escola de Sociologia e Política de São Paulo, he is known for his research on race in Brazil, particularly his years long studies on racial dynamics in the state of Bahia. He is considered an important figure in the studies of sociology and human ecology in Brazil in the 20th century through his "community studies".

== Biography ==
Pierson was born in Kansas on September 8, 1900. He received his doctorate degree from the University of Chicago in 1939, the subject of his doctoral thesis being on race relations in Bahia. The thesis was based on research made from 1935 to 1937. Afterwards, he remained as a professor at the Escola de Sociologia e Política de São Paulo until 1959. His 1942 book, Negroes in Brazil, a Study of Race Contact at Bahia, based on his thesis, contains numerical tables classifying people based on race, and concluded that although Black people had occupied the lower ranks of the Brazilian social hierarchy, there was not racism as it had been defined in the United States. His findings largely advanced the now-disproven racial democracy theory of Brazilian society, which posited that Brazilian society at large was not racist and that societal inequities were defined by class rather than by race. Pierson also dedicated two chapters to the local culture, which has strong influences from Africa.

While at the Escola de Sociologia e Política de São Paulo, he coordinated research and studies, among the most notable being Cruz das Almas: A Brazilian Village (1951) and O Homem no Vale do São Francisco (1972), both part of his "community study" program, the first research program carried out by Pierson.

Pierson was a colleague of Emilio Willems at the Escola de Sociologia e Política de São Paulo, and had, as an important theoretical reference, the German philosopher Georg Simmel. He also initiated his research with a symbolic interactionist perspective, influenced by academics such as George Herbert Mead, Robert E. Park, and Robert Redfield.

Pierson was named a Guggenheim fellow in 1963. He later was also named professor emeritus at the Faculty of Philosophy, Languages and Human Sciences, University of São Paulo in 1993.

Pierson died on October 13, 1995, in Florida.

== Works and publications ==
- Cruz das Almas: A Brazilian Village (Washington Smithsonian Institution), 1951.
- Survey of the Literature on Brazil of Sociological Significance Published up to 1940 (Cambridge: Harvard University Press), 1945.
- Race Relations in Portuguese America (capítulo em Race Relations in World Perspective - University of Hawaii Press), 1955.
- Negroes in Brazil: A Study of Race Contact at Bahia (University of Chicago Press), 1942.
  Brazilian edition: Brancos e pretos na Bahia - estudo de contato racial. With prefaces by Arthur Ramos and Robert E. Park. Companhia Editora Nacional, 1945 (available at Brasiliana Eletrônica).
- Estudos de Ecologia Humana (organizer). São Paulo, 1942.
- Estudos de Organização Social (org.). São Paulo, 1949.
- Teoria e Pesquisa em Sociologia. São Paulo: Melhoramentos, 1965.

== See also ==
- Arthur Ramos
- Edson Carneiro
- Gilberto Freyre
- History of the socialist movement in the United States
- Melville Herskovits
- Rüdiger Bilden
- Ruth Landes
