= Nyinba =

Nepalese ethnic group

Nyinba is an ethnic group of people living in the Humla District of Nepal. They are the ethnic tribe living primarily in four villages Bargaun, Burause, Nimatang, and Torpa for centuries located in Humla district. They practice Tibetan Buddhism. They used to heavily depend upon livestock, farming, and usually trade goods and services with Tibet (Purang) for their survival. Nowadays, many Nyinba's migrated to Kathmandu. Particularly younger generation are staying at area such as Boudha ramhiti, Tinchuli, Narayanthan, and Bhangal.

The Nyinba are also the name given to a small Tibetan-speaking ethnic group living in northwest Nepal. They are known for their practice of polyandry and their strong preference of daughters and were studied by anthropologist Nancy Levine in the 1980s.
