= Gilda de Melo e Sousa =

Brazilian philosopher

- Born: 24 March 1919; São Paulo, Brazil
- Died: 25 December 2005 (aged 86); São Paulo, Brazil
- Education: University of São Paulo
- Occupations: Philosophy professor, literary critic, essayist
- Writing career
- Notable work: O tupi e o alaúde: uma interpretação de Macunaíma

Gilda Rocha de Melo e Sousa (24 March 1919 – 25 December 2005), also spelled Gilda Rocha de Mello e Souza, was a Brazilian philosopher, literary critic, essayist, and university professor.

== Biography ==
She was born Gilda Moraes Rocha in São Paulo in 1919 and grew up in Araraquara, inland in São Paulo state. She returned to the city of São Paulo in 1930 to attend school. In 1937, she enrolled in the University of São Paulo (USP) graduating with a bachelor's in philosophy in 1940. She was one of the first women to attend the university. While there, she studied under such notable professors as Roger Bastide, Claude Lévi-Strauss, and Jean Maugüé.

She then helped found the cultural magazine Clima, alongside her future husband Antonio Candido and other young intellectuals of the era. In 1952, she received a doctorate in social sciences, with a thesis on 19th-century fashion, and in 1954 she became the founding director of the teaching of aesthetics at USP's Philosophy Department. She would go on to direct the department from 1969 to 1972, a period of significant repression of academics under the military dictatorship. In her time as an academic, she was particularly interested in studying the work of Mário de Andrade, with her publications including the central study O Tupi e o Alaúde on his Macunaíma.

After retiring in 1973, in 1999 she was named professor emerita in the USP's Faculty of Philosophy, Letters, and Humanities.

She married the critic and sociologist Antonio Candido de Mello e Souza in 1943, and the couple had three children. Gilda de Melo e Souza died in 2005, at age 86, at São Paulo's Albert Einstein Israelite Hospital. In 2014, professor Walnice Nogueira Galvão published A palavra afiada, a collection of some of de Melo e Sousa's interviews, letters, and writings.

== Selected works ==
- O Tupi e o Alaúde: uma Interpretação de Macunaíma (1979, seminal work on the study of Macunaíma)
- Mário de Andrade, obra escogida (1979)
- Exercícios de leitura (1980)
- O espírito das roupas: a moda no século XIX (1987)
- Os melhores poemas de Mário de Andrade (editor, 2000)
- A ideia e o figurado (2005)
