= Antonio Candido =

Brazilian writer and literary critic (1918–2017)

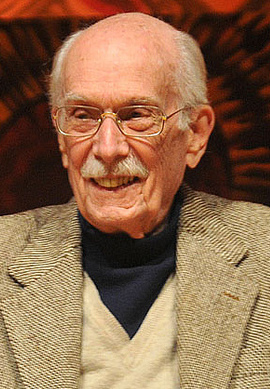
- Candido at the Literature Festival of Paraty in 2011
- Born: Antonio Candido de Mello e Sousa; July 24, 1918; Rio de Janeiro, Brazil
- Died: May 12, 2017 (aged 98); São Paulo, Brazil
- Occupations: Author, literary critic, sociologist, professor
- Spouse: Gilda de Melo e Sousa
- Writing career
- Language: Portuguese
- Notable awards: Prêmio Jabuti, Prêmio Camões, Prêmio Machado de Assis, Alfonso Reyes International Prize

Antonio Candido de Mello e Souza (July 24, 1918 – May 12, 2017) was a Brazilian writer, professor, sociologist, and literary critic. As a critic of Brazilian literature, he is regarded as having been one of the foremost scholars on the subject by Brazilian universities. He was the co-winner of the Prêmio Jabuti for essays in 1965 and was awarded the Prêmio Machado de Assis in 1993, the Camões Prize in 1998, and the Alfonso Reyes International Prize in 2005.

Candido was professor-emeritus at the University of São Paulo and São Paulo State University, and doctor honoris causa by the University of Campinas.

== Biography ==
Son of Aristides Candido de Mello e Souza, M.D., and Clarisse Tolentino de Mello e Souza, most of his childhood was spent in the Brazilian countryside, in the states of Minas Gerais and São Paulo. During this period, he did not attend school, being taught at home by his mother. In 1937, he and his family settled down in São Paulo, where he received formal education. In 1939, Candido began studying law at the University of São Paulo School of Law, a course he would eventually abandon in order to study philosophy at the same university.

His first critical works were published in 1941, in the magazine Clima, co-founded by himself, and, in the following year, he began teaching at the University of São Paulo, first in the department of sociology and later, a position he would hold, albeit with a brief interval from 1958 to 1960, for thirty-six years. Candido also taught Brazilian Literature at the University of Paris from 1964 to 1966, and became a visiting scholar at Yale University two years later.

His best-known work of literary criticism was published in 1959, entitled Formação da Literatura Brasileira (literally, "Formation of Brazilian Literature), a highly polemic and influential study of the foundations of his country's literary arts.

Candido was also active in politics during many periods of his life: he was a militant activist against Getúlio Vargas's Estado Novo and helped to found the Worker's Party in 1980.

Candido married Gilda de Melo e Sousa in 1943, a Brazilian essayist and fellow professor at the University of São Paulo, with whom he had three daughters.

Candido was hospitalized at Albert Einstein Hospital in São Paulo days before his death on May 12, 2017, due to a hiatus hernia. He was 98.

== Major works ==
- Introdução ao Método Crítico de Sílvio Romero – 1945
- Brigada Ligeira – 1945
- Ficção e Confissão – 1956
- O Observador Literário – 1959
- Formação da Literatura Brasileira – Momentos Decisivos – 1959
- Presença da Literatura Brasileira – 1964 – com J. Aderaldo Castello
- Tese e Antítese – 1964
- Os Parceiros do Rio Bonito – 1964
- Literatura e Sociedade – 1965
- Literatura e Cultura de 1900 a 1945–1970
- Vários Escritos – 1970
- Teresina Etc. – 1980
- Na Sala de Aula – 1985
- A Educação pela Noite e Outros Ensaios – 1987
- O Discurso e a Cidade – 1993
- Recortes – 1993
- O Romantismo no Brasil – 2002
- Um Funcionário da Monarquia – 2002
- O Albatroz e o Chinês – 2004
- Iniciação à Literatura Brasileira – 2004

== Partial bibliography ==
- Antonio Candido: On Literature and Society by Antonio Candido with Howard S. Becker as translator. (Princeton University Press: May 5, 1995) ISBN 0-691-03630-6
- Antonio Candido's entry at Enciclopédia Itaú Cultural
