= Florestan Fernandes =

Brazilian politician and sociologist

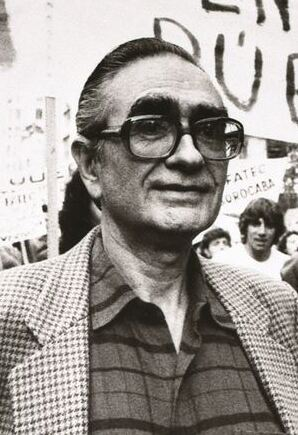

Federal Deputy
- In office 1 February 1987 – 1 February 1995
- Constituency: São Paulo

Personal details
- Born: 22 July 1920 São Paulo, Brazil
- Died: 10 August 1995 (aged 75) São Paulo, Brazil
- Party: PSR (1943–1950); PT (1980–1995)
- Spouse: Myriam Rodrigues (m. 1944)
- Education: University of São Paulo (BSS)
- Profession: Sociologist
- Awards: Prêmio Jabuti (1964)

Florestan Fernandes (22 July 1920 – 10 August 1995) was a Brazilian sociologist and politician. He was also elected federal deputy twice.

== Life and career ==
Fernandes came from a poor family with his mother being a "washerwoman". In youth he took a series of odd jobs and had an erratic education until he attended the University of São Paulo in 1941. In 1945 he graduated and by 1964 was a full professor in sociology. In that same year he won the Prêmio Jabuti. In 1969 he fled to Canada for political reasons and began to teach at the University of Toronto. In 1986 he returned to Brazil and became involved in the Partido dos Trabalhadores.

In his treatment of Marxism, he is known for presenting hybrid views that diverged from orthodox theory and from conventional leftist practical concessions. His name is closely associated with the modernization of sociological research in Brazil and Latin America. A sociologist and university professor with more than 50 published works, he transformed social thought in Brazil and established a new standard of sociological research characterized by analytical and critical rigor. He also advanced a new level of intellectual performance.

At 75 he died of an embolism related to liver trouble and dialysis treatment.

=== Electoral history ===
Year	Election	Party	Office	Votes	Percent	Result
1986	State Elections of São Paulo	PT	Federal Deputy	50,024	0.32%	Elected
1990	State Elections of São Paulo	PT	Federal Deputy	27,676	0.16%	Elected
