= Barnet Woolf =

British scientist

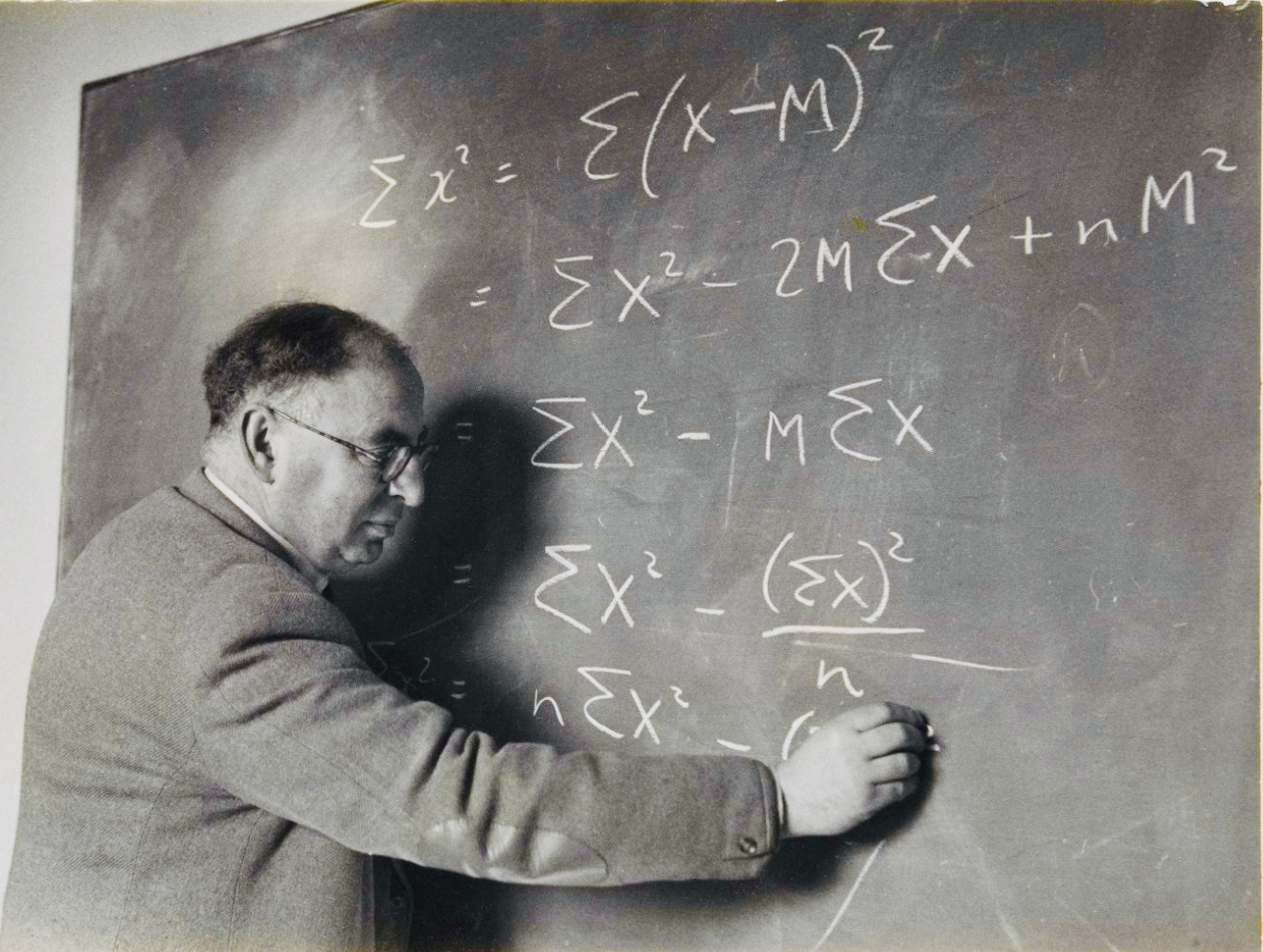
- Barnet Woolf
- Born: 24 November 1902; Hackney, London
- Died: 20 March 1983 (aged 80); Fife, Scotland
- Education: Sidney Sussex College, Cambridge
- Known for: Linear plots in enzyme kinetics; political activism
- Spouse: Cecil Drillien (m. 1945)
- Scientific career
- Workplaces: Sir William Dunn Institute of Biochemistry, Cambridge; Clinical Laboratory of the London Hospital; Birmingham University; Edinburgh University
- Thesis: Resting Bacteria and Enzyme Action
- Academic advisors: Frederick Gowland Hopkins, John Marrack, Lancelot Hogben

Barnet Woolf FRSE (24 November 1902 – 20 March 1983) was a 20th-century British scientist, whose disciplines had a broad scope. He made lasting contributions to biochemistry, genetics, epidemiology, nutrition, public health, statistics, and computer science. His name appears in the Hanes–Woolf plot for enzyme kinetic data.

== Life & Politics ==
Born and raised in Hackney, the son of a cabinet maker, and influenced by the deprivation of the East End of London he joined the Communist Party as a founder member in 1920. In 1936 he helped to organise at Cable Street where demonstrators prevented the Mosleyites marching through the Jewish East End. He left the Party in 1939 due to the Molotov–Ribbentrop Pact but rejoined in 1941 when the USSR joined the war. He finally left in 1949 due to profound disagreement with the way Lysenko's flawed science was adopted in the Soviet Union. His membership of the Party fostered a friendship with JBS Haldane.

== Science ==
In 1921 Woolf gained a place at Sidney Sussex College, Cambridge, something that would have been unaffordable without a full scholarship, to read for the Natural Science Tripos, and graduated in 1924 with a double first. He remained in Cambridge, working in the Sir William Dunn Institute of Biochemistry under Sir Frederick Gowland Hopkins, on a series of scholarships. In 1930 he gained a PhD for a thesis on 'Resting Bacteria and Enzyme Action' and was one of the first people to do E. coli biochemistry. Colleagues at the Institute included JBS Haldane, Joseph Needham and Norman Pirie.

From 1934 to 1940 he worked at the Clinical Laboratory of the London Hospital under Professor John Marrack, where his research turned towards social medicine, and in 1940 he became Owen Research Fellow at Birmingham University under Lancelot Hogben.

After the war he was appointed to the staff of Edinburgh University, first in the department of social medicine and then in the department of genetics, where he was promoted to senior lecturer and finally made reader in 1969.

In 1947 he was elected a Fellow of the Royal Society of Edinburgh. His proposers were Francis Albert Eley Crew, James Gray Kyd, Lancelot Hogben and John Du Plessis Langrishe.

At Edinburgh University, he was notable for providing a statistical and computational service for research workers in the medical and other faculties.

Woolf was interested in the computing procedures required in statistical methods. His FRSE obituary notes that 'Woolf's 1951 paper on "Computation and interpretation of multiple regression" is a model of clarity of exposition and was to become very widely used.

With his interests in methods of calculation he foresaw the importance of computers in statistics, and pushed for the development of computing the university, which was not in the forefront of computing in the early 1960s.

=== Plotting enzyme kinetic data ===
The Henri–Michaelis–Menten equation expresses the initial rate $v$ of an enzyme-catalysed reaction that follows the simplest type of kinetics in terms of the substrate concentration $a$ in terms of two parameters, the limiting rate $V$ and the half-saturation constant (or Michaelis constant) $K_\mathrm{m}$:

(1) $v = \frac{Va}{K_\mathrm{m} + a}$

Woolf pointed out that this could be transformed in three different ways into equations for plottig the data as a straight line:

(2) $\frac{1}{v} = \frac{1}{V} + \frac{K_\mathrm{m}}{V}\cdot \frac{1}{a}$

(3) $\frac{a}{v} = \frac{K_\mathrm{m}}{V} + \frac{1}{V}\cdot a$

(4) $v = V - K_\mathrm{m}\cdot \frac{v}{a}$

The first of the corresponding plots is by far the most widely used and is called a Lineweaver–Burk plot or a double-reciprocal plot. The second is called a Hanes–Woolf plot or a Woolf plot, and the third is called an Eadie plot, a Hofstee plot or an Eadie–Hofstee plot.

Note, however, that all three were first given by Woolf, even though only one of them is commonly named after him. However, as Haldane later explained, Woolf was injured in a traffic accident and was unable to publish these equations himself.

=== Statistical work ===
Woolf's statistical research on infant mortality in the large towns of England and Wales during the decade 1928-38 demonstrated how poor social conditions caused infant deaths. Published in 1945, his paper was described by a scientific reviewer in 1996 as "a model study of inequalities in health".

During World War II Woolf worked as a statistician in the Medical Research branch of the War Office, analysing issues such as the efficacy of penicillin treatment of battle wounds. Reports of this and other work were for restricted circulation.

== Writings ==
Woolf was a considerable wit and the lyricist of satirical songs on politics for Unity Theatre in the late 1930s and early 40s, many with melodies by the American Big Band leader Van Phillips. A number of these songs published by the Workers Music Association. The best known of these is " Pity the Downtrodden Landlord," which has been recorded by, among others, The Weavers, Alfie Bass, Stan Kelly, Oscar Brand and Fred Hellerman, and was published in America in 1948 in 'The People's Songbook'. The editors noted that the song 'was caught up by thousands of United States tenants threatened with eviction when Congress lifted rent controls.'

In the 1960s Woolf wrote the book and Van Phillips the score for the musical 'Skerryvore', based on a play by James Bridie about a fictional Scottish University, which was performed on both the amateur and professional stage in Scotland in the 1960s and 70s. Woolf also set songs on scientific life to popular tunes for his colleagues in the genetics department of Edinburgh University.
