= Secondary plot =

A secondary plot may refer to:

- Secondary plot, in drama, another name for a subplot that is auxiliary to the main plot
- Secondary plot (kinetics), a graphical transformation of primary kinetic data used to derive kinetic constants
