= Secondary plot (kinetics) =

Plot used in enzyme kinetics

In enzyme kinetics, a secondary plot uses the intercept or slope from several Lineweaver–Burk plots to find additional kinetic constants.

For example, when a set of v by [S] curves from an enzyme with a ping–pong mechanism (varying substrate A, fixed substrate B) are plotted in a Lineweaver–Burk plot, a set of parallel lines will be produced.

The following Michaelis–Menten equation relates the initial reaction rate v_{0} to the substrate concentrations [A] and [B]:

$$\begin{align}
\frac{1}{v_0} &= \frac{ K_M^A}{v_\max {[}A{]}}+\frac{ K_M^B}{v_\max {[}B{]}}+\frac{1}{v_\max}
\end{align}$$

The y-intercept of this equation is equal to the following:

$$\begin{align}
\mbox{y-intercept} = \frac{ K_M^B}{v_\max {[}B{]}}+\frac{1}{v_\max}
\end{align}$$

The y-intercept is determined at several different fixed concentrations of substrate B (and varying substrate A). The y-intercept values are then plotted versus 1/[B] to determine the Michaelis constant for substrate B, $K_M^B$, as shown in the Figure to the right. The slope is equal to $K_M^B$ divided by $v_\max$ and the intercept is equal to 1 over $v_\max$.

Secondary Plot of enzyme system Horseradish Peroxidase and o-Phenylenediamine (with hydrogen peroxide as the second substrate)

== Secondary plot in inhibition studies ==
A secondary plot may also be used to find a specific inhibition constant, K_{I}.

For a competitive enzyme inhibitor, the apparent Michaelis constant is equal to the following:

$$\begin{align}
\mbox{apparent } K_m=K_m\times \left(1+\frac{[I]}{K_I}\right)
\end{align}$$

The slope of the Lineweaver-Burk plot is therefore equal to:

$$\begin{align}
\mbox{slope} =\frac{K_m}{v_\max}\times \left(1+\frac{[I]}{K_I}\right)
\end{align}$$

If one creates a secondary plot consisting of the slope values from several Lineweaver-Burk plots of varying inhibitor concentration [I], the competitive inhbition constant may be found. The slope of the secondary plot divided by the intercept is equal to 1/K_{I}. This method allows one to find the K_{I} constant, even when the Michaelis constant and v_{max} values are not known.
