= Scatchard equation =

Equation used in molecular biology

The Scatchard equation is an equation used in molecular biology to calculate the affinity and number of binding sites of a receptor for a ligand. It is named after the American chemist George Scatchard.

== Equation ==
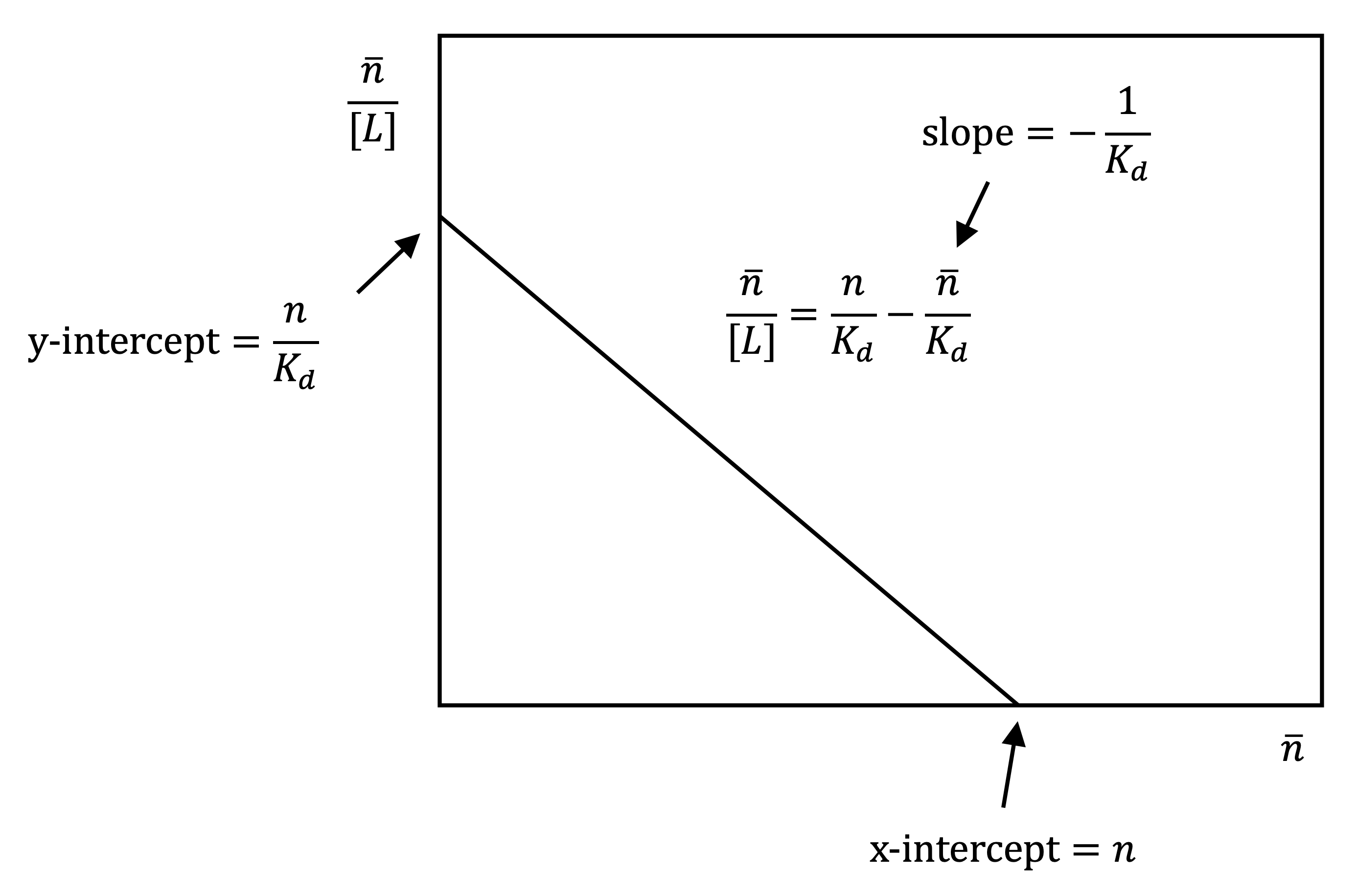
An example of a Scatchard plot, which relates ligand binding and affinity.

Throughout this article, [RL] denotes the concentration of a receptor-ligand complex, [R] the concentration of free receptor, and [L] the concentration of free ligand (so that the total concentration of the receptor and ligand are [R]+[RL] and [L]+[RL], respectively). Let n be the number of binding sites for ligand on each receptor molecule, and let n̅ represent the average number of ligands bound to a receptor. Let K_{d} denote the dissociation constant between the ligand and receptor. The Scatchard equation is given by

$$\frac{\bar{n}}{[L]} = \frac{n}{K_d} - \frac{\bar{n}}{K_d}$$

By plotting n̅/[L] versus n̅, the Scatchard plot shows that the slope equals to -1/K_{d} while the x-intercept equals the number of ligand binding sites n.

== Derivation ==
=== n=1 Ligand ===
When each receptor has a single ligand binding site, the system is described by

$$[R] + [L] \underset{k_{\text{off}}}{\overset{k_{\text{on}}}{\rightleftharpoons}} [RL]$$

with an on-rate (k_{on}) and off-rate (k_{off}) related to the dissociation constant through K_{d}=k_{off}/k_{on}. When the system equilibrates,

$$k_{\text{on}} [R] [L] = k_{\text{off}} [RL]$$

so that the average number of ligands bound to each receptor is given by

$$\bar{n} = \frac{[RL]}{[R] + [RL]} = \frac{[L]}{K_d + [L]} = (1 - \bar{n}) \frac{[L]}{K_d}$$

which is the Scatchard equation for n=1.

=== n=2 Ligands ===
When each receptor has two ligand binding sites, the system is governed by

$$[R] + [L] \underset{k_{\text{off}}}{\overset{2k_{\text{on}}}{\rightleftharpoons}} [RL]$$
$$[RL] + [L] \underset{2k_{\text{off}}}{\overset{k_{\text{on}}}{\rightleftharpoons}} [RL_2].$$

At equilibrium, the average number of ligands bound to each receptor is given by

$$\bar{n} = \frac{[RL] + 2[RL_2]}{[R] + [RL] + [RL_2]} = \frac{2\frac{[L]}{K_d} + 2 \left( \frac{[L]}{K_d} \right)^2}{\left( 1 + \frac{[L]}{K_d} \right)^2} = \frac{2[L]}{K_d + [L]} = (2 - \bar{n}) \frac{[L]}{K_d}$$

which is equivalent to the Scatchard equation.

=== General Case of n Ligands ===
For a receptor with n binding sites that independently bind to the ligand, each binding site will have an average occupancy of [L]/(K_{d} + [L]). Hence, by considering all n binding sites, there will

$$\bar{n} = n \frac{[L]}{K_d + [L]} = (n - \bar{n}) \frac{[L]}{K_d}.$$

ligands bound to each receptor on average, from which the Scatchard equation follows.

== Problems with the method ==
The Scatchard method is less used nowadays because of the availability of computer programs that directly fit parameters to binding data. Mathematically, the Scatchard equation is related to Eadie-Hofstee method, which is used to infer kinetic properties from enzyme reaction data. Many modern methods for measuring binding such as surface plasmon resonance and isothermal titration calorimetry provide additional binding parameters that are globally fit by computer-based iterative methods.
