= Enzyme kinetics =

Study of biochemical reaction rates catalysed by an enzyme

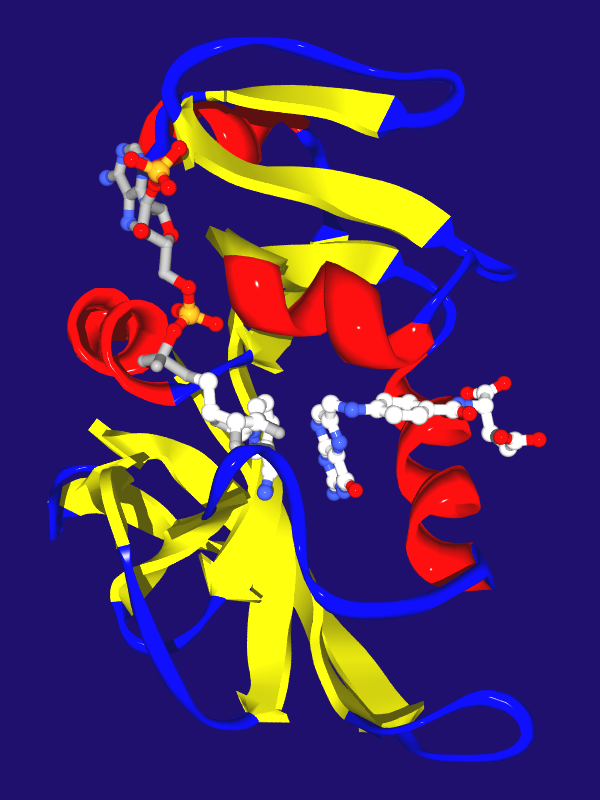
Dihydrofolate reductase from E. coli with its two substrates dihydrofolate (right) and NADPH (left), bound in the active site. The protein is shown as a ribbon diagram, with alpha helices in red, beta sheets in yellow and loops in blue. (PDB: 7DFR)

Enzyme kinetics is the scientific study of chemical reactions caused by enzyme catalysis, and a subfield of biochemistry. It is concerned with the reaction rate of chemical reactions, their effects, and the varying conditions that cause the reactions. Studying an enzyme's kinetics in this way can reveal the catalytic reaction mechanism of this enzyme, its role in metabolism, how its activity is controlled, and how a drug or a modifier (inhibitor or activator) might affect the rate.

An enzyme, often written "E" in reactions, is a protein molecule that serves as a biological catalyst to facilitate and accelerate a chemical reaction in a cell or other biological environment. It does this through binding of one or more other molecules, its substrate (S), which the enzyme acts upon to form the desired product. The substrate binds to the active site of the enzyme to produce an enzyme-substrate complex (ES), and is transformed into an enzyme-product complex (EP) and from there to the product or products (P), via a transition state (ES*). That series of steps is known as the mechanism:

E + S ⇄ ES ⇄ ES* ⇄ EP ⇄ E + P

When enzymes bind multiple substrates, such as dihydrofolate reductase, enzyme kinetics can also show the sequence in which these substrates bind and the sequence in which products are released. An example of enzymes that bind a single substrate and release multiple products are proteases, which cleave one protein substrate into two polypeptide products. Others join two substrates together, such as DNA polymerase linking a nucleotide to DNA. Although these mechanisms are often a complex series of steps, there is typically one rate-determining step that determines the overall kinetics of the entire process. This step may be a chemical reaction or a conformational change of the enzyme or substrates, such as those involved in the release of product(s) from the enzyme.

Knowledge of the enzyme's structure is helpful in interpreting kinetic data. For example, the structure can suggest how substrates and products bind during catalysis; what changes occur during the reaction; and even the role of particular amino acid residues in the mechanism. Some enzymes change shape significantly during the mechanism; in such cases, it is helpful to determine the enzyme structure with and without bound substrate analogues that do not undergo the enzymatic reaction.

Not all biological catalysts are protein enzymes: RNA-based catalysts such as ribozymes and ribosomes are essential to many cellular functions, such as RNA splicing and translation. The main difference between ribozymes and enzymes is that RNA catalysts are composed of nucleotides, whereas enzymes are composed of amino acids. Ribozymes also perform a more limited set of reactions, although their mechanisms and kinetics can be analysed and classified by the same methods.

== General principles ==
As larger amounts of substrate are added to a reaction, the available enzyme binding sites become filled to the limit of the maximum rate $V_\max$. Beyond this limit the enzyme is saturated with substrate and the reaction rate ceases to increase.

The reaction catalysed by an enzyme uses exactly the same reactants and produces exactly the same products as the uncatalysed reaction. Like other catalysts, enzymes do not alter the position of equilibrium between substrates and products. However, unlike uncatalysed chemical reactions, enzyme-catalysed reactions display saturation kinetics. For a given enzyme concentration and for relatively low substrate concentrations, the reaction rate increases linearly with substrate concentration; the enzyme molecules are largely free to catalyse the reaction, and increasing substrate concentration means an increasing rate at which the enzyme and substrate molecules encounter one another. However, at relatively high substrate concentrations, the reaction rate asymptotically approaches the theoretical maximum; the enzyme active sites are almost all occupied by substrates resulting in saturation, and the reaction rate is determined by the intrinsic turnover rate of the enzyme. The substrate concentration midway between these two limiting cases is denoted by K_{M}. Thus, K_{M} is the substrate concentration at which the reaction velocity is half of the maximum velocity.

The two important properties of enzyme kinetics are how easily the enzyme can be saturated with a substrate, and the maximum rate it can achieve. Knowing these properties suggests what an enzyme might do in the cell and can show how the enzyme will respond to changes in these conditions.

== Enzyme assays ==
Progress curve for an enzyme reaction. The slope in the initial rate period is the initial rate of reaction v. The Michaelis–Menten equation describes how this slope varies with the concentration of substrate.

Enzyme assays are laboratory procedures that measure the rate of enzyme reactions. Since enzymes are not consumed by the reactions they catalyse, enzyme assays usually follow changes in the concentration of either substrates or products to measure the rate of reaction. There are many methods of measurement. Spectrophotometric assays observe the change in the absorbance of light between products and reactants; radiometric assays involve the incorporation or release of radioactivity to measure the amount of product made over time. Spectrophotometric assays are most convenient since they allow the rate of the reaction to be measured continuously. Although radiometric assays require the removal and counting of samples (i.e., they are discontinuous assays), they are usually extremely sensitive and can measure very low levels of enzyme activity. An analogous approach is to use mass spectrometry to monitor the incorporation or release of stable isotopes as the substrate is converted into product. Occasionally, an assay fails and approaches are essential to resurrect a failed assay.

The most sensitive enzyme assays use lasers focused through a microscope to observe changes in single enzyme molecules as they catalyse their reactions. These measurements either use changes in the fluorescence of cofactors during an enzyme's reaction mechanism, or of fluorescent dyes added onto specific sites of the protein to report movements that occur during catalysis. These studies provide a new view of the kinetics and dynamics of single enzymes, as opposed to traditional enzyme kinetics, which observes the average behaviour of populations of millions of enzyme molecules.

An example progress curve for an enzyme assay is shown above. The enzyme produces product at an initial rate that is approximately linear for a short period after the start of the reaction. As the reaction proceeds and substrate is consumed, the rate continuously slows (so long as the substrate is not still at saturating levels). To measure the initial (and maximal) rate, enzyme assays are typically carried out while the reaction has progressed only a few percent towards total completion. The length of the initial rate period depends on the assay conditions and can range from milliseconds to hours. However, equipment for rapidly mixing liquids allows fast kinetic measurements at initial rates of less than one second. These very rapid assays are essential for measuring pre-steady-state kinetics.

Most enzyme kinetics studies concentrate on this initial, approximately linear part of enzyme reactions. However, it is also possible to measure the complete reaction curve and fit this data to a non-linear rate equation. This way of measuring enzyme reactions is called progress-curve analysis. This approach is useful as an alternative to rapid kinetics when the initial rate is too fast to measure accurately.

The Standards for Reporting Enzymology Data guidelines provide minimum information required to comprehensively report kinetic and equilibrium data from investigations of enzyme activities including corresponding experimental conditions. The guidelines have been developed to report functional enzyme data with rigor and robustness.

== Single-substrate reactions ==
Enzymes with single-substrate mechanisms include isomerases such as triosephosphateisomerase or bisphosphoglycerate mutase, intramolecular lyases such as adenylate cyclase, and the hammerhead ribozyme, an RNA lyase. However, some enzymes that only have a single substrate do not fall into this category of mechanisms. Catalase is an example of this, as the enzyme reacts with a first molecule of hydrogen peroxide substrate, becomes oxidised and is then reduced by a second molecule of substrate. Although a single substrate is involved, the existence of a modified enzyme intermediate means that the mechanism of catalase is actually a ping–pong mechanism, a type of mechanism that is discussed in the Multi-substrate reactions section below.

=== Michaelis–Menten kinetics ===
A chemical reaction mechanism with or without enzyme catalysis. The enzyme (E) binds substrate (S) to produce product (P).

Saturation curve for an enzyme reaction showing the relation between the substrate concentration and reaction rate

As enzyme-catalysed reactions are saturable, their rate of catalysis does not show a linear response to increasing substrate. If the initial rate of the reaction is measured over a range of substrate concentrations (denoted as [S]), the initial reaction rate ($v_0$) increases as [S] increases. However, as [S] gets higher, the enzyme becomes saturated with substrate and the initial rate reaches V_{max}, the enzyme's maximum rate.

In the Michaelis–Menten kinetic model of a single-substrate reaction there is an initial bimolecular reaction between the enzyme E and substrate S to form the enzyme–substrate complex ES. The rate of enzymatic reaction increases with the increase of the substrate concentration up to a certain level called V_{max}; at V_{max}, increase in substrate concentration does not cause any increase in reaction rate as there is no more enzyme (E) available for reacting with substrate (S). Here, the rate of reaction becomes dependent on the ES complex and the reaction becomes a unimolecular reaction with an order of zero. Though the enzymatic mechanism for the unimolecular reaction $\ce{ES ->[k_{cat}] E + P}$ can be quite complex, there is typically one rate-determining enzymatic step that allows this reaction to be modelled as a single catalytic step with an apparent unimolecular rate constant k_{cat}. If the reaction path proceeds over one or several intermediates, k_{cat} will be a function of several elementary rate constants, whereas in the simplest case of a single elementary reaction (e.g. no intermediates) it will be identical to the elementary unimolecular rate constant k_{2}. The apparent unimolecular rate constant k_{cat} is also called turnover number, and denotes the maximum number of enzymatic reactions catalysed per second.

The Michaelis–Menten equation describes how the (initial) reaction rate v_{0} depends on the position of the substrate-binding equilibrium and the rate constant k_{2}.

$v_0 = \frac{V_{\max}[\ce{S}]}{K_M + [\ce{S}]}$ (Michaelis–Menten equation)

with the constants

$$\begin{align}
K_M \ &\stackrel{\mathrm{def}}{=}\  \frac{k_{2} + k_{-1}}{k_{1}} \approx K_D\\
V_\max \ &\stackrel{\mathrm{def}}{=}\   k_{cat}\ce{[E]}_{tot}
\end{align}$$

This Michaelis–Menten equation is the basis for most single-substrate enzyme kinetics. Two crucial assumptions underlie this equation (apart from the general assumption about the mechanism only involving no intermediate or product inhibition, and there is no allostericity or cooperativity). The first assumption is the so-called quasi-steady-state assumption (or pseudo-steady-state hypothesis), namely that the concentration of the substrate-bound enzyme (and hence also the unbound enzyme) changes much more slowly than those of the product and substrate and thus the change over time of the complex can be set to zero.

$d\ce{[ES]}/{dt} \; \overset{!} = \;0$.

The second assumption is that the total enzyme concentration does not change over time, thus

$\ce{[E]}_\text{tot} = \ce{[E]} + \ce{[ES]} \; \overset{!} = \; \text{const}$.

The Michaelis constant K_{M} is experimentally defined as the concentration at which the rate of the enzyme reaction is half V_{max}, which can be verified by substituting [S] = K_{M} into the Michaelis–Menten equation and can also be seen graphically. If the rate-determining enzymatic step is slow compared to substrate dissociation ($k_2 \ll k_{-1}$), the Michaelis constant K_{M} is roughly the dissociation constant K_{D} of the ES complex. If $\ce{[S]}$ is small compared to $K_M$ then the term $[\ce S] / (K_M + [\ce S]) \approx [\ce S] / K_M$ and also very little ES complex is formed, thus $\ce{[E]_{\rm tot} \approx [E]}$. Therefore, the rate of product formation is

$$v_0 \approx  \frac{k_{cat}}{K_M} \ce{[E] [S]} \qquad \qquad \text{if } [\ce S] \ll K_M$$

Thus the product formation rate depends on the enzyme concentration as well as on the substrate concentration, the equation resembles a bimolecular reaction with a corresponding pseudo-second order rate constant $k_2 / K_M$. This constant is a measure of catalytic efficiency. The most efficient enzymes reach a $k_2 / K_M$ in the range of 10^{8} – 10^{10} M^{−1} s^{−1}. These enzymes are so efficient they effectively catalyse a reaction each time they encounter a substrate molecule and have thus reached an upper theoretical limit for efficiency (diffusion limit); and are sometimes referred to as kinetically perfect enzymes. But most enzymes are far from perfect: the average values of $k_{2}/K_{\rm M}$ and $k_{2}$ are about $10^5 {\rm s}^{-1}{\rm M}^{-1}$ and $10 {\rm s}^{-1}$, respectively.

=== Direct use of the Michaelis–Menten equation for time course kinetic analysis ===
The observed velocities predicted by the Michaelis–Menten equation can be used to directly model the time course disappearance of substrate and the production of product through incorporation of the Michaelis–Menten equation into the equation for first order chemical kinetics. This can only be achieved, however, if one recognises the problem associated with the use of Euler's number in the description of first order chemical kinetics. i.e. e^{−k} is a split constant that introduces a systematic error into calculations and can be rewritten as a single constant which represents the remaining substrate after each time period.

$$[S]=[S]_0(1-k)^{t}\,$$

$$[S]=[S]_0(1-v/[S]_0)^{t}\,$$

$$[S]=[S]_0(1-(V_{\max} [S]_0 / (K_M + [S]_0)/[S]_0))^{t}\,$$

In 1983 Stuart Beal (and also independently Santiago Schnell and Claudio Mendoza in 1997) derived a closed form solution for the time course kinetics analysis of the Michaelis-Menten mechanism. The solution, known as the Schnell-Mendoza equation, has the form:

$$\frac{[S]}{K_M} = W \left[ F(t) \right]\,$$

where W[ ] is the Lambert-W function and where F(t) is

$$F(t) = \frac{[S]_0}{K_M} \exp\!\left(\frac{[S]_0}{K_M} - \frac{V_\max}{K_M}\,t \right) \,$$

This equation is encompassed by the equation below, obtained by Berberan-Santos, which is also valid when the initial substrate concentration is close to that of enzyme,

$$\frac{[S]}{K_M} = W \left[ F(t) \right]- \frac{V_\max}{k_{cat} K_M}\ \frac{W \left[ F(t) \right]}{1+W \left[ F(t) \right]}\,$$

where W[ ] is again the Lambert-W function.

=== Linear plots of the Michaelis–Menten equation ===
Lineweaver–Burk or double-reciprocal plot of kinetic data, showing the significance of the axis intercepts and gradient

The plot of v versus [S] above is not linear; although initially linear at low [S], it bends over to saturate at high [S]. Before the modern era of nonlinear curve-fitting on computers, this nonlinearity could make it difficult to estimate K_{M} and V_{max} accurately. Therefore, several researchers developed linearisations of the Michaelis–Menten equation, such as the Lineweaver–Burk plot, the Eadie–Hofstee diagram and the Hanes–Woolf plot. All of these linear representations can be useful for visualising data, but none should be used to determine kinetic parameters, as computer software is readily available that allows for more accurate determination by nonlinear regression methods.

The Lineweaver–Burk plot or double reciprocal plot is a common way of illustrating kinetic data. This is produced by taking the reciprocal of both sides of the Michaelis–Menten equation. This is a linear form of the Michaelis–Menten equation and produces a straight line with the equation y = mx + c with a y-intercept equivalent to 1/V_{max} and an x-intercept of the graph representing −1/K_{M}.

$$\frac{1}{v} = \frac{K_{M}}{V_{\max} [\mbox{S}]} + \frac{1}{V_\max}$$

No experimental values can be taken at negative 1/[S]; the lower limiting value 1/[S] = 0 (the y-intercept) corresponds to an infinite substrate concentration, where 1/v=1/V_{max} thus, the x-intercept is an extrapolation of the experimental data taken at positive concentrations. More generally, the Lineweaver–Burk plot skews the importance of measurements taken at low substrate concentrations and thus can yield inaccurate estimates of V_{max} and K_{M}. A more accurate linear plotting method is the Eadie–Hofstee plot. In this case, v is plotted against v/[S]. In the third common linear representation, the Hanes–Woolf plot, [S]/v is plotted against [S]. In general, data normalisation can help diminish the amount of experimental work and can increase the reliability of the output, and is suitable for both graphical and numerical analysis.

=== Practical significance of kinetic constants ===
The study of enzyme kinetics is important for two basic reasons. Firstly, it helps explain how enzymes work, and secondly, it helps predict how enzymes behave in living organisms. The kinetic constants defined above, K_{M} and V_{max}, are critical to attempts to understand how enzymes work together to control metabolism. Making these predictions is not trivial, even for simple systems. For example, oxaloacetate is formed by malate dehydrogenase within the mitochondrion. Oxaloacetate can then be consumed by citrate synthase, phosphoenolpyruvate carboxykinase or aspartate aminotransferase, feeding into the citric acid cycle, gluconeogenesis or aspartic acid biosynthesis, respectively. Being able to predict how much oxaloacetate goes into which pathway requires knowledge of the concentration of oxaloacetate as well as the concentration and kinetics of each of these enzymes. This aim of predicting the behaviour of metabolic pathways reaches its most complex expression in the synthesis of huge amounts of kinetic and gene expression data into mathematical models of entire organisms. Alternatively, one useful simplification of the metabolic modelling problem is to ignore the underlying enzyme kinetics and only rely on information about the reaction network's stoichiometry, a technique called flux balance analysis.

=== Michaelis–Menten kinetics with intermediate ===
One could also consider the less simple case

$$\ce{{E} + S
<=>[k_{1}][k_{-1}]
ES
->[k_2]
EI
->[k_3]
{E} + P}$$

where a complex with the enzyme and an intermediate exists and the intermediate is converted into product in a second step. In this case we have a very similar equation

$$v_0 = k_{cat}\frac\ce{[S] [E]_0}{K_M^{\prime}+ \ce{[S]}}$$

but the constants are different

$$\begin{align}
K_M^{\prime} \ &\stackrel{\mathrm{def}}{=}\  \frac{k_3}{k_2 + k_3} K_M = \frac{k_3}{k_2 + k_3} \cdot \frac{k_{2} + k_{-1}}{k_{1}}\\
k_{cat} \ &\stackrel{\mathrm{def}}{=}\  \dfrac{k_3 k_2}{k_2 + k_3}
\end{align}$$

We see that for the limiting case $k_3 \gg k_2$, thus when the last step from $\ce{EI -> E + P}$ is much faster than the previous step, we get again the original equation. Mathematically we have then $K_M^{\prime} \approx K_M$ and $k_{cat} \approx k_2$.

== Multi-substrate reactions ==
Multi-substrate reactions follow complex rate equations that describe how the substrates bind and in what sequence. The analysis of these reactions is much simpler if the concentration of substrate A is kept constant and substrate B varied. Under these conditions, the enzyme behaves just like a single-substrate enzyme, and a plot of v by [S] gives apparent K_{M} and V_{max} constants for substrate B. If a set of these measurements is performed at different fixed concentrations of A, these data can be used to work out what the mechanism of the reaction is. For an enzyme that takes two substrates A and B and turns them into two products P and Q, there are two types of mechanism: ternary complex and substituted-enzyme mechanisms.

Ternary-complex mechanisms

Random-order ternary-complex mechanism for an enzyme reaction. The reaction path is shown as a line, and enzyme intermediates containing substrates A and B or products P and Q are written below the line.

In these enzymes, both substrates bind to the enzyme at the same time to produce an EAB ternary complex. The order of binding can either be random (in a random mechanism) or substrates have to bind in a particular sequence (in an ordered mechanism). When a set of v by [S] curves (fixed A, varying B) from an enzyme with a ternary-complex mechanism are plotted in a Lineweaver–Burk plot, the set of lines produced will intersect.

Enzymes with ternary-complex mechanisms include glutathione S-transferase, dihydrofolate reductase and DNA polymerase.

Substituted-enzyme ("ping–pong") mechanisms

$\ce{\overset{}{E ->[\ce{A \atop \downarrow}] EA <=> E^\ast P ->[\ce{P \atop \uparrow}] E^\ast ->[\ce{B \atop \downarrow}] E^\ast B <=> EQ ->[\ce{Q \atop \uparrow}] E}}$
Ping–pong mechanism for an enzyme reaction. Intermediates contain substrates A and B or products P and Q.

Enzymes with a substituted-enzyme mechanism can exist in two states, E and a chemically modified form of the enzyme E*; this modified enzyme is known as an intermediate. In such mechanisms, substrate A binds, changes the enzyme to E* by, for example, transferring a chemical group to the active site, and is then released. Only after the first substrate is released can substrate B bind and react with the modified enzyme, regenerating the unmodified E form. When a set of v by [S] curves (fixed A, varying B) from an enzyme with a substituted-enzyme mechanism are plotted in a Lineweaver–Burk plot, a set of parallel lines will be produced. This is called a secondary plot.

Enzymes with substituted-enzyme mechanisms include some oxidoreductases such as thioredoxin peroxidase, transferases such as acylneuraminate cytidylyltransferase and serine proteases such as trypsin and chymotrypsin. Serine proteases are a very common and diverse family of enzymes, including digestive enzymes (trypsin, chymotrypsin, and elastase), several enzymes of the blood clotting cascade, and many others. In these serine proteases, the E* intermediate is an acyl-enzyme species formed by the attack of an active site serine residue on a peptide bond in a protein substrate.

=== Memory effects ===
Both of these two types of mechanism can display enzyme memory, with very different causes and consequences in the two cases. In ternary complex mechanisms, these are possible if the mechanism includes slow processes and the binding steps are not at quasi-equilibrium, because the intermediates may be swept away very fast. This can generate cooperativity, even in monomeric enzymes. In a substituted-enzyme mechanism, slow steps are not needed to generate memory effects. Instead, for an enzyme with several alternative substrates, the kinetic properties of the second half reaction may vary with different substrates in the first half reaction, even though the same substituted enzyme seems to be transformed.

Reversible catalysis and the Haldane equation

External factors may limit the ability of an enzyme to catalyse a reaction in both directions (whereas the nature of a catalyst in itself means that it cannot catalyse just one direction, according to the principle of microscopic reversibility). We consider the case of an enzyme that catalyses the reaction in both directions:

$\ce{{E} + {S} <=>[k_{1}][k_{-1}] ES <=>[k_{2}][k_{-2}] {E} + {P}}$

The steady-state, initial rate of the reaction is $v_0 = \frac{d\, [{\rm P}]}{dt} = \frac{(k_1 k_2\, [{\rm S}]- k_{-1}k_{-2}[{\rm P}])[{\rm E}]_0}{k_{-1}+k_2+k_1\, [{\rm S}]+k_{-2}\, [{\rm P}]}$

$v_0$ is positive if the reaction proceed in the forward direction ($S \rightarrow P$) and negative otherwise.

Equilibrium requires that $v=0$, which occurs when $\frac{[{\rm P}]_{\rm eq}}{[{\rm S}]_{\rm eq}}=\frac{k_1 k_2}{k_{-1} k_{-2}}=K_{\rm eq}$. This shows that thermodynamics forces a relation between the values of the four rate constants.

The values of the forward and backward maximal rates, obtained for $[{\rm S}] \rightarrow \infty$, $[{\rm P}] =0$, and $[{\rm S}] =0$, $[{\rm P}] \rightarrow \infty$, respectively, are $V_{\rm max}^f = k_{2} {\rm [E]}_{tot}$ and $V_{\rm max}^b = -k_{-1} {\rm [E]}_{tot}$, respectively. Their ratio is not equal to the equilibrium constant, which implies that thermodynamics does not constrain the ratio of the maximal rates. This explains that enzymes can be much "better catalysts" (in terms of maximal rates) in one particular direction of the reaction.

One can also derive the two Michaelis constants $K_M^S=(k_{-1}+k_2)/k_1$and $K_M^P=(k_{-1}+k_2)/k_{-2}$. The Haldane equation is the relation $K_{\rm eq}=\frac{[{\rm P}]_{\rm eq}}{[{\rm S}]_{\rm eq}}=\frac{V_{\rm max}^f / K_M^S}{V_{\rm max}^b / K_M^P}$.

Therefore, thermodynamics constrains the ratio between the forward and backward $V_{\rm max}/K_M$ values, not the ratio of $V_{\rm max}$values.

== Non-Michaelis–Menten kinetics ==
Saturation curve for an enzyme reaction showing sigmoid kinetics

Many different enzyme systems follow non-Michaelis-Menten behavior. A select few examples include kinetics of self-catalytic enzymes, cooperative and allosteric enzymes, interfacial and intracellular enzymes, processive enzymes, and so forth. Some enzymes produce a sigmoid v by [S] plot, which often indicates cooperative binding of substrate to the active site. This means that the binding of one substrate molecule affects the binding of subsequent substrate molecules. This behavior is most common in multimeric enzymes with several interacting active sites. Here, the mechanism of cooperation is similar to that of hemoglobin, with binding of substrate to one active site altering the affinity of the other active sites for substrate molecules. Positive cooperativity occurs when binding of the first substrate molecule increases the affinity of the other active sites for substrate. Negative cooperativity occurs when binding of the first substrate decreases the affinity of the enzyme for other substrate molecules. Allosteric enzymes include mammalian tyrosyl tRNA-synthetase, which shows negative cooperativity, and bacterial aspartate transcarbamoylase and phosphofructokinase which show positive cooperativity. Cooperativity is common and can help regulate the responses of enzymes to changes in the concentrations of their substrates. Positive cooperativity makes enzymes much more sensitive to [S] and their activities can show large changes over a narrow range of substrate concentration. Conversely, negative cooperativity makes enzymes insensitive to small changes in [S].

The Hill equation is often used to describe the degree of cooperativity quantitatively in non-Michaelis–Menten kinetics. The derived Hill coefficient n measures how much the binding of substrate to one active site affects the binding of substrate to the other active sites. A Hill coefficient of <1 indicates negative cooperativity and a coefficient of >1 indicates positive cooperativity.

== Pre-steady-state kinetics ==
Pre-steady state progress curve, showing the burst phase of an enzyme reaction

In the first moment after an enzyme is mixed with substrate, no product has been formed and no intermediates exist. The study of the next few milliseconds of the reaction is called pre-steady-state kinetics. Pre-steady-state kinetics is therefore concerned with the formation and consumption of enzyme–substrate intermediates (such as ES or E*) until their steady-state concentrations are reached.

This approach was first applied to the hydrolysis reaction catalysed by chymotrypsin. Often, the detection of an intermediate is a vital piece of evidence in investigations of what mechanism an enzyme follows. For example, in the ping–pong mechanisms that are shown above, rapid kinetic measurements can follow the release of product P and measure the formation of the modified enzyme intermediate E*. In the case of chymotrypsin, this intermediate is formed by an attack on the substrate by the nucleophilic serine in the active site and the formation of the acyl-enzyme intermediate.

In the figure, the enzyme produces E* rapidly in the first few seconds of the reaction. The rate then slows as steady state is reached. This rapid burst phase of the reaction measures a single turnover of the enzyme. Consequently, the amount of product released in this burst, shown as the intercept on the y-axis of the graph, also gives the amount of functional enzyme which is present in the assay.

== Chemical mechanism ==
An important goal of measuring enzyme kinetics is to determine the chemical mechanism of an enzyme reaction, i.e., the sequence of chemical steps that transform substrate into product. The kinetic approaches discussed above will show at what rates intermediates are formed and inter-converted, but they cannot identify exactly what these intermediates are.

Kinetic measurements taken under various solution conditions or on slightly modified enzymes or substrates often shed light on this chemical mechanism, as they reveal the rate-determining step or intermediates in the reaction. For example, the breaking of a covalent bond to a hydrogen atom is a common rate-determining step. Which of the possible hydrogen transfers is rate determining can be shown by measuring the kinetic effects of substituting each hydrogen by deuterium, its stable isotope. The rate will change when the critical hydrogen is replaced, due to a primary kinetic isotope effect, which occurs because bonds to deuterium are harder to break than bonds to hydrogen. It is also possible to measure similar effects with other isotope substitutions, such as ^{13}C/^{12}C and ^{18}O/^{16}O, but these effects are more subtle.

Isotopes can also be used to reveal the fate of various parts of the substrate molecules in the final products. For example, it is sometimes difficult to discern the origin of an oxygen atom in the final product, since it may have come from water or from part of the substrate. This may be determined by systematically substituting oxygen's stable isotope ^{18}O into the various molecules that participate in the reaction and checking for the isotope in the product. The chemical mechanism can also be elucidated by examining the kinetics and isotope effects under different pH conditions, by altering the metal ions or other bound cofactors, by site-directed mutagenesis of conserved amino acid residues, or by studying the behaviour of the enzyme in the presence of analogues of the substrate(s).

== Enzyme inhibition and activation ==
Kinetic scheme for reversible enzyme inhibitors

Enzyme inhibitors are molecules that reduce or abolish enzyme activity, while enzyme activators are molecules that increase the catalytic rate of enzymes. These interactions can be either reversible (i.e., removal of the inhibitor restores enzyme activity) or irreversible (i.e., the inhibitor permanently inactivates the enzyme).

=== Reversible inhibitors ===
Traditionally, reversible enzyme inhibitors have been classified as competitive, uncompetitive, or non-competitive, according to their effects on K_{M} and V_{max}. These different effects result from the inhibitor binding to the enzyme E, to the enzyme–substrate complex ES, or to both, respectively. The division of these classes arises from a problem in their derivation and results in the need to use two different binding constants for one binding event. The binding of an inhibitor and its effect on the enzymatic activity are two distinctly different things, another problem the traditional equations fail to acknowledge. In noncompetitive inhibition the binding of the inhibitor results in 100% inhibition of the enzyme only, and fails to consider the possibility of anything in between. In noncompetitive inhibition, the inhibitor will bind to an enzyme at its allosteric site; therefore, the binding affinity, or inverse of K_{M}, of the substrate with the enzyme will remain the same. On the other hand, the V_{max} will decrease relative to an uninhibited enzyme. On a Lineweaver-Burk plot, the presence of a noncompetitive inhibitor is illustrated by a change in the y-intercept, defined as 1/V_{max}. The x-intercept, defined as −1/K_{M}, will remain the same. In competitive inhibition, the inhibitor will bind to an enzyme at the active site, competing with the substrate. As a result, the K_{M} will increase and the V_{max} will remain the same. The common form of the inhibitory term also obscures the relationship between the inhibitor binding to the enzyme and its relationship to any other binding term, be it the Michaelis–Menten equation or a dose response curve associated with ligand receptor binding. To demonstrate the relationship the following rearrangement can be made:

$$\cfrac{V_\max}{1 + \cfrac{[I]}{K_i}}
=
\cfrac{V_\max}{\cfrac{[I]+K_i}{K_i}}$$

Adding zero to the bottom ([I]-[I])

$$\cfrac{V_\max}{\cfrac{[I]+K_i}{[I]+K_i-[I]}}$$

Dividing by [I]+K_{i}

$$\cfrac{V_\max}{\cfrac{1}{1 - \cfrac{[I]}{[I]+K_i}}}
=
V_\max - V_\max \cfrac{[I]}{[I]+K_i}$$

This notation demonstrates that similar to the Michaelis–Menten equation, where the rate of reaction depends on the percent of the enzyme population interacting with substrate, the effect of the inhibitor is a result of the percent of the enzyme population interacting with inhibitor. The only problem with this equation in its present form is that it assumes absolute inhibition of the enzyme with inhibitor binding, when in fact there can be a wide range of effects anywhere from 100% inhibition of substrate turn over to just >0%. To account for this, the equation can be modified to allow for different degrees of inhibition by including a delta V_{max} term.

$$V_\max - \Delta V_\max \cfrac{[I]}{[I]+K_i}$$

or

$$V_{\max1} -  (V_{\max1} - V_{\max2} ) \cfrac{[I]}{[I]+K_i}$$

This term can then define the residual enzymatic activity present when the inhibitor is interacting with individual enzymes in the population. However, the inclusion of this term has the added value of allowing for the possibility of activation if the secondary V_{max} term turns out to be higher than the initial term. To account for the possibly of activation as well, the notation can then be rewritten replacing the inhibitor "I" with a modifier term denoted here as "X".

$$V_{\max1} -  (V_{\max1} - V_{\max2} ) \cfrac{[X]}{[X]+K_x}$$

While this terminology results in a simplified way of dealing with kinetic effects relating to the maximum velocity of the Michaelis–Menten equation, it highlights potential problems with the term used to describe effects relating to the K_{M}. The K_{M} relating to the affinity of the enzyme for the substrate should in most cases relate to potential changes in the binding site of the enzyme which would directly result from enzyme inhibitor interactions. As such, a term similar to the one proposed above to modulate V_{max} should be appropriate in most situations:

$$K_{m1} -  (K_{m1} - K_{m2} ) \cfrac{[X]}{[X]+K_x}$$

=== Irreversible inhibitors ===
Enzyme inhibitors can also irreversibly inactivate enzymes, usually by covalently modifying active site residues. These reactions, which may be called suicide substrates, follow exponential decay functions and are usually saturable. Below saturation, they follow first order kinetics with respect to inhibitor. Irreversible inhibition could be classified into two distinct types. Affinity labelling is a type of irreversible inhibition where a functional group that is highly reactive modifies a catalytically critical residue on the protein of interest to bring about inhibition. Mechanism-based inhibition, on the other hand, involves binding of the inhibitor followed by enzyme mediated alterations that transform the latter into a reactive group that irreversibly modifies the enzyme.

== Mechanisms of catalysis ==
The energy variation as a function of reaction coordinate shows the stabilisation of the transition state by an enzyme.

The favoured model for the enzyme–substrate interaction is the induced fit model. This model proposes that the initial interaction between enzyme and substrate is relatively weak, but that these weak interactions rapidly induce conformational changes in the enzyme that strengthen binding. These conformational changes also bring catalytic residues in the active site close to the chemical bonds in the substrate that will be altered in the reaction. Conformational changes can be measured using circular dichroism or dual polarisation interferometry. After binding takes place, one or more mechanisms of catalysis lower the energy of the reaction's transition state by providing an alternative chemical pathway for the reaction. Mechanisms of catalysis include catalysis by bond strain; by proximity and orientation; by active-site proton donors or acceptors; covalent catalysis and quantum tunnelling. Enzymes can accelerate hydrogen transfer reactions by quantum tunneling, a phenomenon where particles such protons or electrons pass through an energy barrier rather than over it, due to their wave-like nature.

Enzyme kinetics cannot prove which modes of catalysis are used by an enzyme. However, some kinetic data can suggest possibilities to be examined by other techniques. For example, a ping–pong mechanism with burst-phase pre-steady-state kinetics would suggest covalent catalysis might be important in this enzyme's mechanism. Alternatively, the observation of a strong pH effect on V_{max} but not K_{M} might indicate that a residue in the active site needs to be in a particular ionisation state for catalysis to occur.

== History ==
In 1902 Victor Henri proposed a quantitative theory of enzyme kinetics, but at the time the experimental significance of the hydrogen ion concentration was not yet recognized. After Peter Lauritz Sørensen had defined the logarithmic pH-scale and introduced the concept of buffering in 1909, the German chemist Leonor Michaelis and Dr. Maud Leonora Menten (a postdoctoral researcher in Michaelis's lab at the time) repeated Henri's experiments and confirmed his equation, which is now generally referred to as Michaelis-Menten kinetics (sometimes also Henri-Michaelis-Menten kinetics). Their work was further developed by G. E. Briggs and J. B. S. Haldane, who derived kinetic equations that are still widely considered today a starting point in modeling enzymatic activity.

The major contribution of the Henri-Michaelis-Menten approach was to think of enzyme reactions in two stages. In the first, the substrate binds reversibly to the enzyme, forming the enzyme-substrate complex. This is sometimes called the Michaelis complex. The enzyme then catalyzes the chemical step in the reaction and releases the product. The kinetics of many enzymes is adequately described by the simple Michaelis-Menten model, but all enzymes have internal motions that are not accounted for in the model and can have significant contributions to the overall reaction kinetics. This can be modeled by introducing several Michaelis-Menten pathways that are connected with fluctuating rates, which is a mathematical extension of the basic Michaelis Menten mechanism.

== See also ==
- Protein dynamics
- Diffusion-limited enzyme
- Langmuir adsorption model

== Bibliography ==
- Ochs, Raymond S (2014). Biochemistry. Burlington, Mass: Jones & Bartlett Publishers. ISBN 978-1-4496-6137-3.
