= Eadie–Hofstee diagram =

Graph of enzyme kinetics

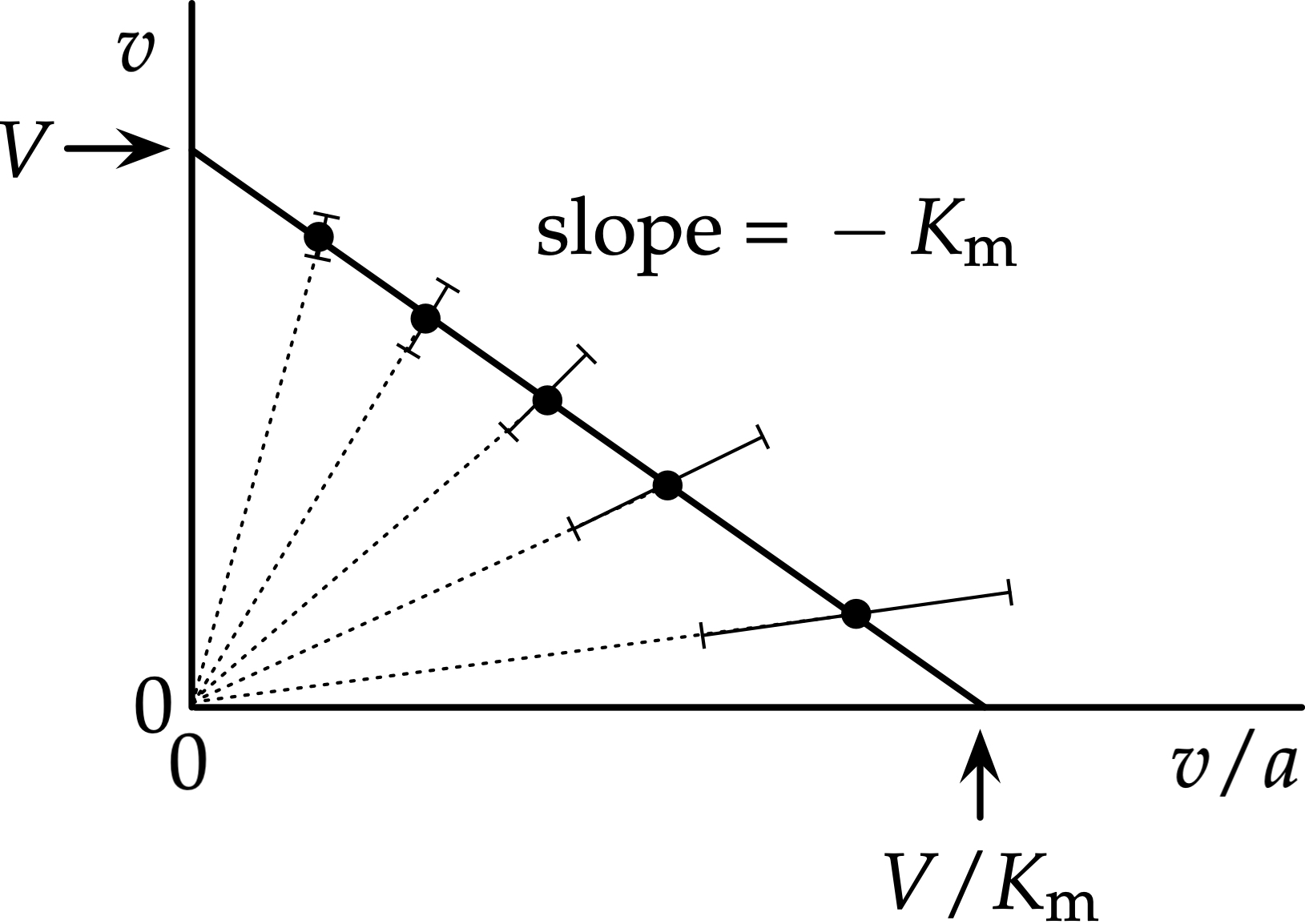
Eadie–Hofstee plot of v against v/a for Michaelis–Menten kinetics

In biochemistry, an Eadie–Hofstee plot (or Eadie–Hofstee diagram) is a graphical representation of the Michaelis–Menten equation in enzyme kinetics. It has been known by various different names, including Eadie plot, Hofstee plot and Augustinsson plot. Attribution to Woolf is often omitted, because although Haldane and Stern credited Woolf with the underlying equation, it was just one of the three linear transformations of the Michaelis–Menten equation that they initially introduced. However, Haldane indicated in 1957 that Woolf had indeed found the three linear forms:

In 1932, Dr. Kurt Stern published a German translation of my book Enzymes, with numerous additions to the English text. On pp. 119–120, I described some graphical methods, stating that they were due to my friend Dr. Barnett Woolf. [...] Woolf pointed out that linear graphs are obtained when v is plotted against v x^{-1}, v^{−1} against x^{−1}, or v^{−1}x against x, the first plot being most convenient unless inhibition is being studied.

== Derivation of the equation for the plot ==
The simplest equation for the rate $v$ of an enzyme-catalysed reaction as a function of the substrate concentration $a$ is the Michaelis-Menten equation, which can be written as follows:

$$v = {{Va} \over {K_\mathrm{m} + a}}$$

in which $V$ is the rate at substrate saturation (when $a$ approaches infinity, or limiting rate, and $K_\mathrm{m}$ is the value of $a$ at half-saturation, i.e. for $v = 0.5V$, known as the Michaelis constant. Eadie and Hofstee transformed this into straight-line relationship. Multiplication of both sides by ${{K_\mathrm{m} + a} \over {a}}$ gives:

$$K_\mathrm{m} \cdot {v \over a} + v = V$$

This can be directly rearranged to express a straight-line relationship:

$$v = V - K_\mathrm{m} \cdot {v \over a}$$

which shows that a plot of $v$ against $v/a$ is a straight line with intercept $V$ on the ordinate, and slope $-K_\mathrm{m}$ (Hofstee plot).

In the Eadie plot the axes are reversed:

$${v \over a} = {V \over K_\mathrm{m}} - {1 \over K_\mathrm{m}} \cdot v$$

with intercept $V \over K_\mathrm{m}$ on the ordinate, and slope $- {1 \over K_\mathrm{m}}$.

These plots are kinetic versions of the Scatchard plot used in ligand-binding experiments.

== Attribution to Augustinsson ==
The plot is occasionally attributed to Augustinsson and referred to the Woolf–Augustinsson–Hofstee plot or simply the Augustinsson plot. However, although Haldane, Woolf or Eadie were not explicitly cited when Augustinsson introduced the $v$ versus $v/a$ equation, both the work of Haldane and of Eadie are cited at other places of his work and are listed in his bibliography.

== Effect of experimental error ==
Experimental error is usually assumed to affect the rate $v$ and not the substrate concentration $a$, so $v$ is the dependent variable. As a result, both ordinate $v$ and abscissa $v/a$ are subject to experimental error, and so the deviations that occur due to error are not parallel with the ordinate axis but towards or away from the origin. As long as the plot is used for illustrating an analysis rather than for estimating the parameters, that matters very little. Regardless of these considerations various authors have compared the suitability of the various plots for displaying and analysing data.

== Use for estimating parameters ==
Like other straight-line forms of the Michaelis–Menten equation, the Eadie–Hofstee plot was used historically for rapid evaluation of the parameters $K_\mathrm{m}$ and $V$, but has been largely superseded by nonlinear regression methods that are significantly more accurate when properly weighted and no longer computationally inaccessible.

== Making faults in experimental design visible ==
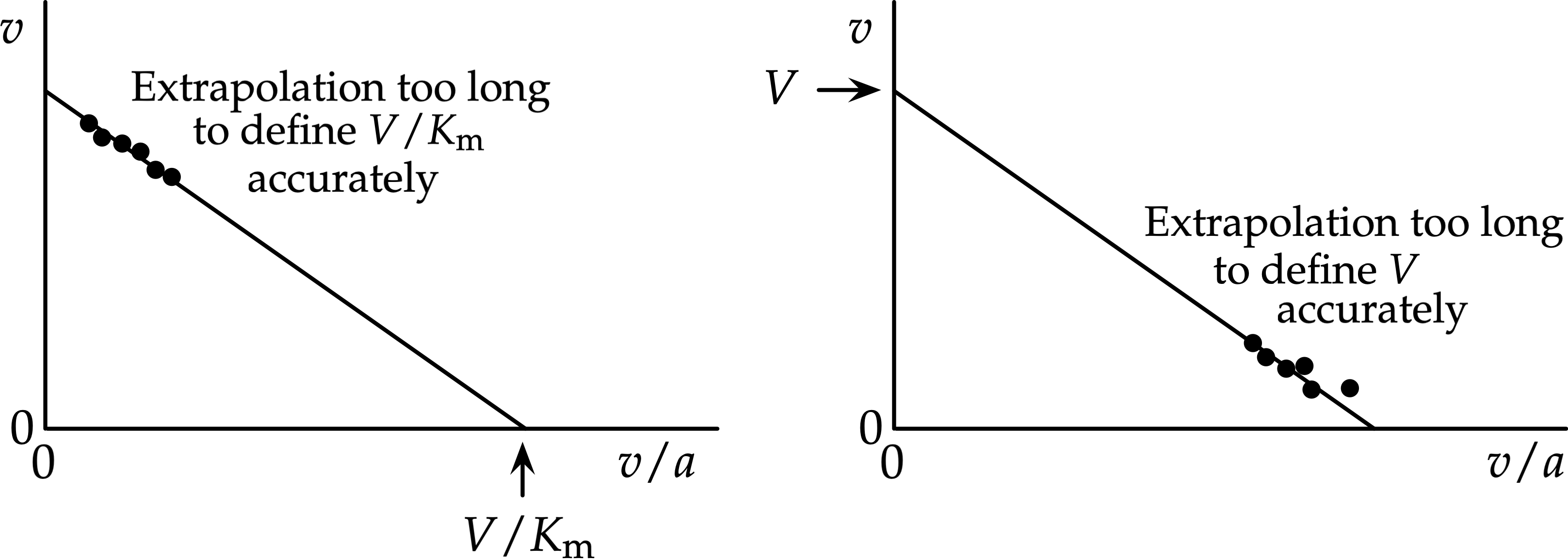
Recognizing poor design in Eadie–Hofstee plots, with most $a$ values too large (left) or too small (right)

As the ordinate scale spans the entire range of theoretically possible $v$ vales, from $0$ to $V$ one can see at a glance at an Eadie–Hofstee plot how well the experimental design fills the theoretical design space, and the plot makes it impossible to hide poor design. By contrast, the other well known straight-line plots make it easy to choose scales that suggest that the design is better than it is. Faulty design, as shown in the right-hand diagram, is common with experiments with a substrate that is not soluble enough or too expensive to use concentrations above $K_\mathrm{m}$, and in this case $V/K_\mathrm{m}$ cannot be estimated satisfactorily. The opposite case, with $a$ values concentrated above $K_\mathrm{m}$ (left-hand diagram) is less common but not unknown, as for example in a study of nitrate reductase.

== See also ==
- Michaelis–Menten kinetics
- Lineweaver–Burk plot
- Hanes–Woolf plot
- Direct linear plot
