= Sir William Dunn Institute of Biochemistry =

Research institute at Cambridge University

Coordinates: 52.198°N 0.124°E

The Sir William Dunn Institute of Biochemistry at Cambridge University was a research institute endowed from the estate of Sir William Dunn, which was the origin of the Cambridge Department of Biochemistry. Created for Frederick Gowland Hopkins on the recommendation of Walter Morley Fletcher, it opened in 1924 and spurred the growth of Hopkins's school of biochemistry. Hopkins's school dominated the discipline of biochemistry from the 1920s through the interwar years and was the source of many leaders of the next generation of biochemists, and the Dunn bequest inaugurated a period of rapid expansion for biochemistry.

== Origin of the Institute ==
In 1918, a trustee of the estate of Sir William Dunn approached a Cambridge biologist, William Bate Hardy, about the possibility of putting some of Dunn's estate toward biomedical science research. Hardy referred the trustee (Charles D. Seligman) to Walter Morley Fletcher, the secretary of the Medical Research Council. The Dunn estate, like much of the philanthropy world, was beginning to look more to "preventive" philanthropy (as opposed to direct aid to the needy) by sponsoring research institutions that could address social ills. Between 1919 and 1925, Fletcher convinced the Dunn trustees to put nearly half a million pounds toward biomedical research.

Fletcher was a long-time friend and institutional ally of Frederick Gowland Hopkins, a pioneering biochemist who was trying to establish "general biochemistry" as a field distinct from either medical physiology or organic chemistry, more a part of biology than medicine. Fletcher lobbied for the Dunn estate to fund Hopkins's proposal, among the over 500 funding proposals submitted. By late 1919, Fletcher was negotiating for a considerable endowment that would allow Hopkins to create an institute solely devoted to biochemistry. The approval of this endowment, ultimately about 210,000 pounds, reversed the declining fortunes of Hopkins's research group, which had been suffering from lack of available academic positions, research space, and able students since World War I. With funding in the works, Hopkins group expanded from 10 researchers in 1920 to 59 in 1925; in 1922 they began using endowment funds and in 1924 the Dunn Institute of Biochemistry opened. Hopkins became the first Sir William Dunn Professor of Biochemistry and head of the new University of Cambridge Department of Biochemistry, and he appointed researchers in a range of specialized fields covering the whole of what he considered the proper, broad domain of biochemistry.

== Hopkins's school of biochemistry ==
Hopkins's school, housed in the Dunn Institute, was both productive and influential. Between World War I and World War II, 40% of the papers in the Biochemical Journal were authored by Hopkins and other Cambridge biochemists. Hopkins's program of "general biochemistry" was unique in having a stable institutional base (unlike in Germany, where there were only a scattered handful of biochemistry professorships) but not being dependent on a medical school (unlike the biochemistry and physiological chemistry departments in the United States).

The Dunn Institute under Hopkins had another unusual feature for the time: Hopkins did not discriminate against hiring Jewish scientists, unlike the large majority of American, British and German universities and medical schools. This may have helped Hopkins assemble such a strong group of researchers, since talented Jewish biochemists had few other options.

== See also ==
- Dunn Human Nutrition Unit, another beneficiary of Dunn's will
