= Uncompetitive inhibition =

Type of enzyme inhibition

Uncompetitive inhibition (which Laidler and Bunting preferred to call anti-competitive inhibition, but this term has not been widely adopted) is a type of enzyme inhibition in which the apparent values of the Michaelis–Menten parameters $V$ and $K_\mathrm{m}$ are decreased in the same proportion.

It can be recognized by two observations: first, it cannot be reversed by increasing the substrate concentration $a$, and second, linear plots show effects on $V$ and $K_\mathrm{m}$, seen, for example, in the Lineweaver–Burk plot as parallel rather than intersecting lines. It is sometimes explained by supposing that the inhibitor can bind to the enzyme-substrate complex but not to the free enzyme. This type of mechanism is rather rare, and in practice uncompetitive inhibition is mainly encountered as a limiting case of inhibition in two-substrate reactions in which one substrate concentration is varied and the other is held constant at a saturating level.

== Mathematical definition ==
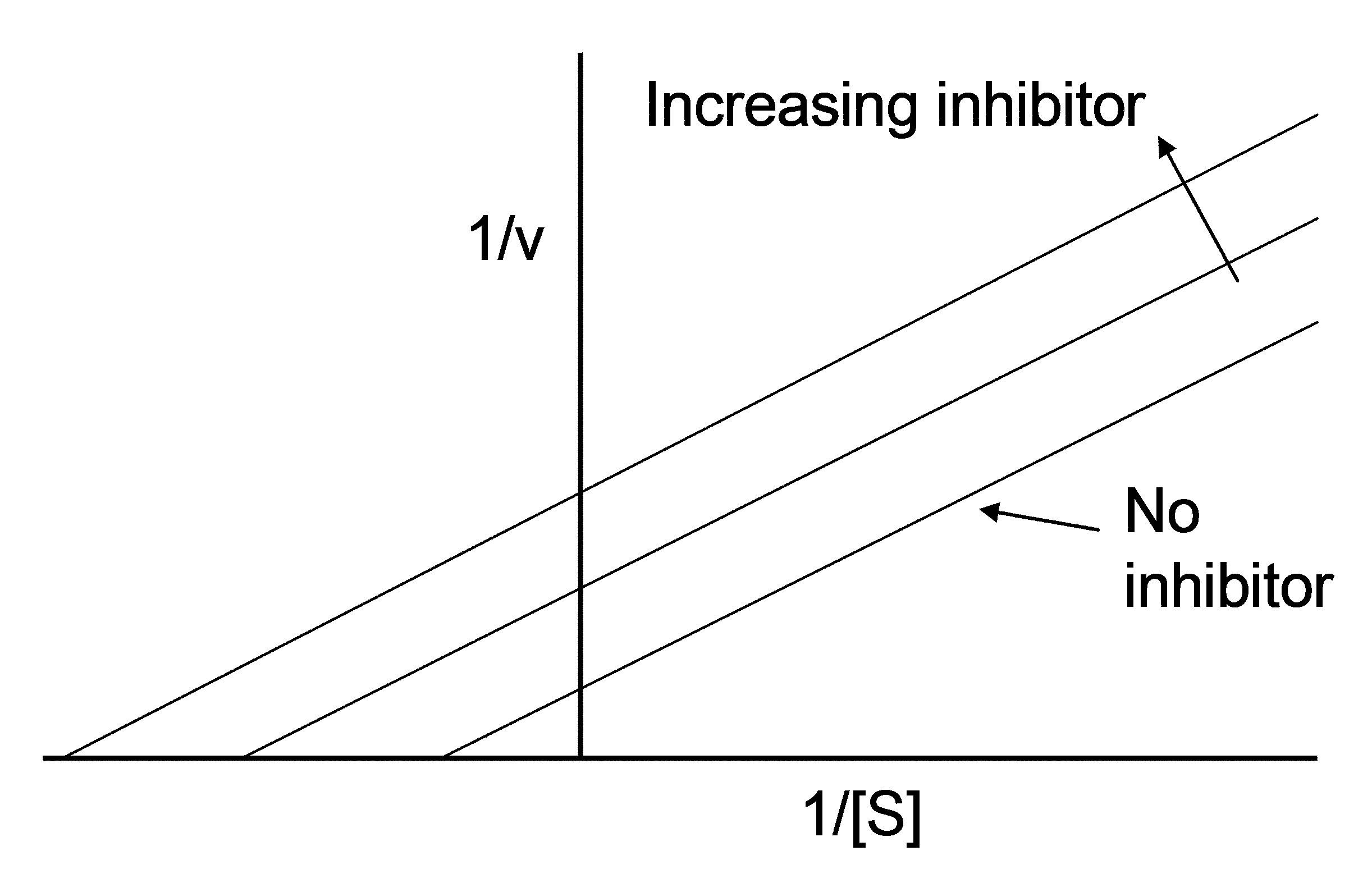
Lineweaver–Burk plot of uncompetitive enzyme inhibition.

In uncompetitive inhibition at an inhibitor concentration of $i$ the Michaelis–Menten equation takes the following form:

$$v=\frac{Va}{K_\mathrm{m} +a(1 + i/K_\mathrm{iu})}$$

in which $v$ is the rate at concentrations $a$ of substrate and $i$ of inhibitor, for limiting rate $V$, Michaelis constant $K_\mathrm{m}$ and uncompetitive inhibition constant $K_\mathrm{iu}$.

This has exactly the form of the Michaelis–Menten equation, as may be seen by writing it in terms of apparent kinetic constants:

$$v=\frac{V^\mathrm{app}a}{K_\mathrm{m}^\mathrm{app} +a}$$

in which $V^\mathrm{app} = \frac{V}{1 + i/K_\mathrm{iu}}\text{ and }K_\mathrm{m}^\mathrm{app} = \frac{K_\mathrm{m}}{1 + i/K_\mathrm{iu}}$

$V^\mathrm{app}$ and $K_\mathrm{m}^\mathrm{app}$ decrease in the same proportions as a result of the inhibition.

This is apparent when viewing a Lineweaver-Burk plot of uncompetitive enzyme inhibition: the ratio between V and K_{m} remains the same with or without an inhibitor present.

This may be seen in any of the common ways of plotting Michaelis–Menten data, such as the Lineweaver–Burk plot, for which for uncompetitive inhibition produces a line parallel to the original enzyme-substrate plot, but with a higher intercept on the ordinate:

$$\frac{1}{v}=\frac{K_\mathrm{m}}{Va} +\frac{1+i/K_\mathrm{iu}}{V}$$

== Implications and uses in biological systems ==
The unique traits of uncompetitive inhibition lead to a variety of implications for the inhibition's effects within biological and biochemical systems. Uncompetitive inhibition is present within biological systems in a number of ways. In fact, it often becomes clear that the traits of inhibition specific to uncompetitive inhibitors, such as their tendency to act at their best at high concentrations of substrate, are essential to some important bodily functions operating properly.

=== Involvement in cancer mechanisms ===
Uncompetitive mechanisms are involved with certain types of cancer. Some human alkaline phosphatases have been found to be over-expressed in certain types of cancers, and those phosphatases often operate via uncompetitive inhibition. It has also been found that a number of the genes that code for human alkaline phosphatases are inhibited uncompetitively by amino acids such as leucine and phenylalanine. Studies of the involved amino acid residues have been undertaken in attempts to regulate alkaline phosphatase activity and learn more about said activity's relevance to cancer.

Additionally, uncompetitive inhibition works alongside transformation-related protein 53 to help repress the activity of cancer cells and prevent tumorigenesis in certain forms of the illness, as it inhibits glucose-6-phosphate dehydrogenase, an enzyme of the pentose phosphate pathway). One of the side roles this enzyme is responsible for is helping to regulate is the control of reactive oxygen levels, as reactive oxygen species must be kept at appropriate levels to allow cells to survive. When concentration of glucose 6-phosphate, the substrate of the enzyme, is high, uncompetitive inhibition of the enzyme becomes far more effective. This extreme sensitivity to substrate concentration within the cancer mechanism implicates uncompetitive inhibition rather than mixed inhibition, which displays similar traits but is often less sensitive to substrate concentration due to some inhibitor binding to free enzymes regardless of the substrate's presence. As such, the extreme strength of uncompetitive inhibitors at high substrate concentrations and the overall sensitivity to substrate amount indicates that only uncompetitive inhibition can make this type of process possible.

=== Importance in cell and organelle membranes ===
Although uncompetitive inhibition is present in various diseases within biological systems, it does not necessarily only relate to pathologies. It can be involved in typical bodily functions. For example, active sites capable of uncompetitive inhibition appear to be present in membranes, as removing lipids from cell membranes and making active sites more accessible through conformational changes has been shown to invoke elements resembling the effects of uncompetitive inhibition (i.e. both $V$ and $K_\mathrm{m}$ decrease). In mitochondrial membrane lipids specifically, removing lipids decreases the α-helix content in mitochondria and leads to changes in ATPase resembling uncompetitive inhibition.

This presence of uncompetitive enzymes in membranes has also been supported in a number of other studies. For example, in studies of the protein ADP ribosylation factor, which is involved in regulating membrane activity, it was found that brefeldin A, a lactone antiviral trapped one of the protein's intermediates via uncompetitive inhibition. This made it clear that this type of inhibition exists within various types of cells and organelles as opposed to just in pathological cells. In fact, brefeldin A was found to relate to the activity of the Golgi apparatus and its role in regulating movement across the cell membrane.

=== Presence in the cerebellar granule layer ===
Memantine

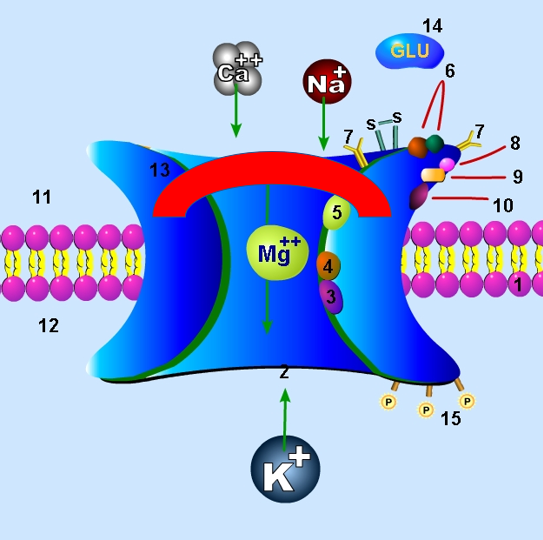
Inhibited N-methyl-D-aspartate glutamate receptor. Substrate is bound and the active site is blocked by the (red) inhibitor.

Uncompetitive inhibition can play roles in various other parts of the body as well. It is part of the mechanism by which N-methyl-D-aspartate glutamate receptors are inhibited in the brain, for example. Specifically, this type of inhibition impacts the granule cells that make up a layer of the cerebellum. These cells have the receptors mentioned, and their activity typically increases as ethanol is consumed. This often leads to withdrawal symptoms if ethanol is removed. Various uncompetitive blockers act as antagonists at the receptors and modify the process, with one example being the inhibitor memantine. In fact, in similar cases (involving over-expression of N-methyl-D-aspartate glutamate receptors, though not necessarily via ethanol), uncompetitive inhibition helps in nullifying the over-expression due to its particular properties. Since uncompetitive inhibitors block high concentrations of substrates very efficiently, their traits alongside the innate characteristics of the receptors themselves lead to very effective blocking of N-methyl-D-aspartate glutamate channels when they are excessively open due to massive amounts of agonists.

== Examples for uncompetitive inhibition ==
Investigations of phenol-based HSD17B13 inhibitors indicate an uncompetitive mode of inhibition against NAD^{+}.
