= Hanes–Woolf plot =

Graph of enzyme kinetics

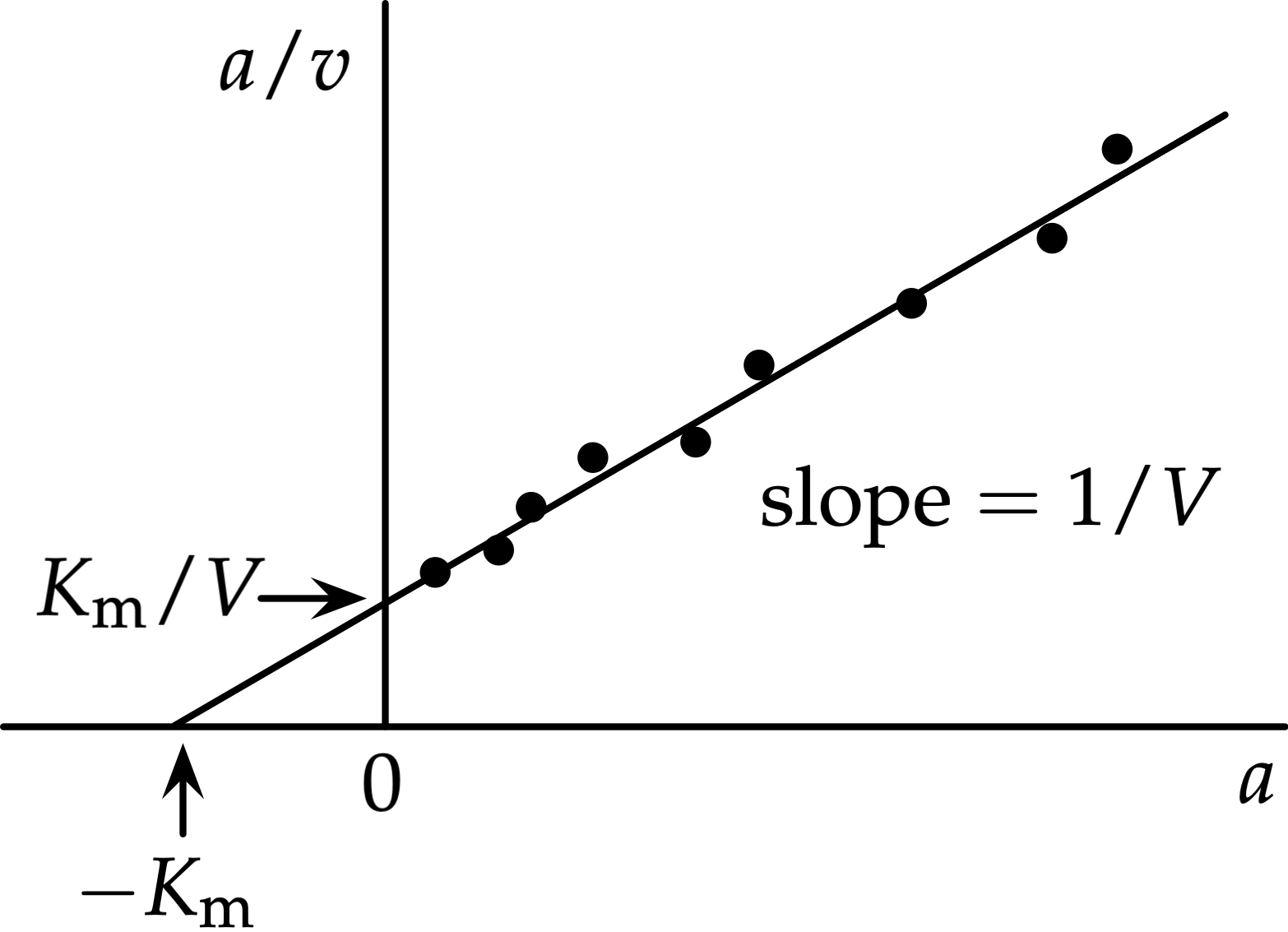
Hanes plot of a/v against a for Michaelis–Menten kinetics

In biochemistry, a Hanes–Woolf plot, Hanes plot, or plot of $a/v$ against $a$ is a graphical representation of enzyme kinetics in which the ratio of the initial substrate concentration $a$ to the reaction velocity $v$ is plotted against $a$. It is based on the rearrangement of the Michaelis–Menten equation shown below:

$${a \over v } =  { a \over V } + { K_\mathrm{m} \over V}$$

where $K_\mathrm{m}$ is the Michaelis constant and $V$ is the limiting rate.

J. B. S. Haldane stated, reiterating what he and K. G. Stern had written in their book, that this rearrangement was due to Barnet Woolf. It was one of three transformations introduced by Woolf. It was first published by C. S. Hanes, who did himself not use it as a plot. Hanes said that the use of linear regression to determine kinetic parameters from this type of linear transformation generates the best fit between observed and calculated values of $1/v$, rather than $v$.

Starting from the Michaelis–Menten equation:

$$v = {{Va} \over {K_\mathrm{m} + a}}$$

we can take reciprocals of both sides of the equation to obtain the equation underlying the Lineweaver–Burk plot:

$${1 \over v} = {1 \over V} + {K_\mathrm{m} \over V} \cdot {1 \over a}$$

which can be multiplied on both sides by ${a}$ to give

$${a \over v} = {1 \over V } \cdot a + {K_\mathrm{m}\over V }$$

Thus in the absence of experimental error data a plot of ${a/v}$ against ${a}$ yields a straight line of slope $1/V$, an intercept on the ordinate of ${K_\mathrm{m}/ V }$and an intercept on the abscissa of $-K_\mathrm{m}$.

Like other techniques that linearize the Michaelis–Menten equation, the Hanes–Woolf plot was used historically for rapid determination of the kinetic parameters $K_\mathrm{m}$, $V$ and $K_\mathrm{m}/V$, but it has been largely superseded by nonlinear regression methods that are significantly more accurate and no longer computationally inaccessible. It remains useful, as a means to present data graphically.

== See also ==
- Michaelis–Menten kinetics
- Lineweaver–Burk plot
- Eadie–Hofstee plot
- Direct linear plot
