= Menten =

Menten is a surname. Notable people with the surname include:

- Hubert Menten (1873–1964), Dutch bobsledder
- Jos Menten (born 1981), Dutch racing driver
- Maud Menten (1879–1960), Canadian bio-medical and medical researcher
- Milan Menten (born 1996), Belgian cyclist
- Pieter Menten (1899–1987), Dutch criminal, businessman and art collector

== See also ==
- Michaelis–Menten kinetics, one of the best-known models of enzyme kinetics
- Michaelis–Menten–Monod kinetics, the coupling of an enzyme-driven chemical reaction of the Michaelis-Menten type
