= J2341+0018 =

BL Lacertae object in the constellation Pisces

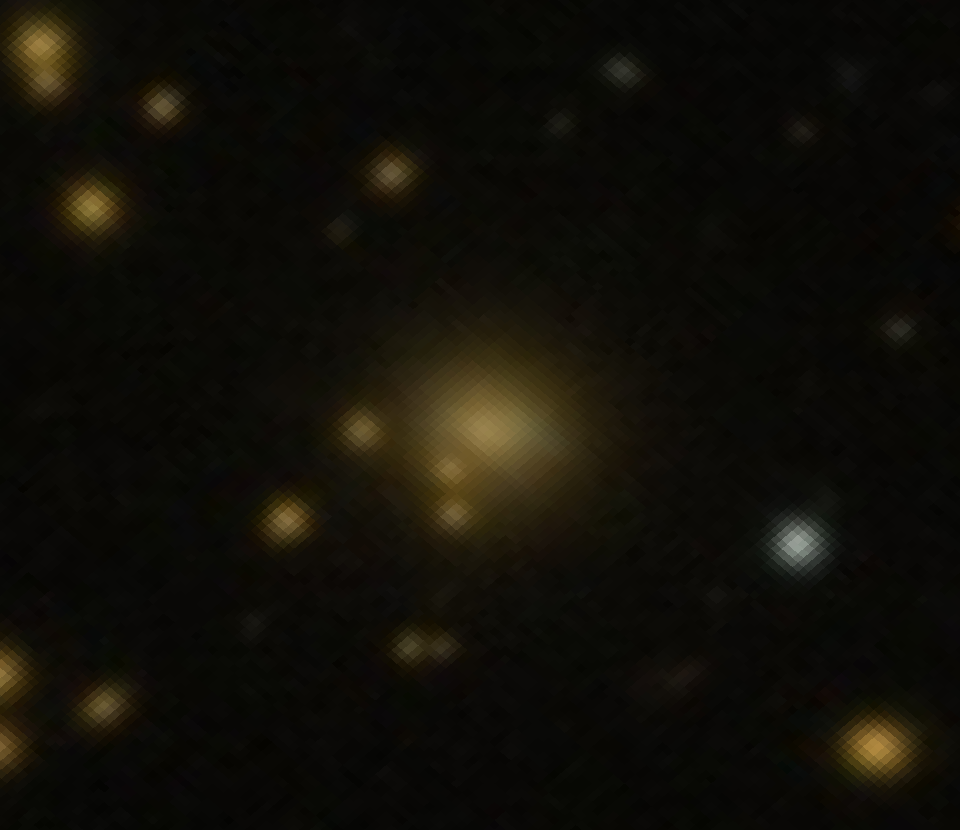
- SDSS image of J2341+0018

Observation data (J2000.0 epoch)
- Constellation: Pisces
- Right ascension: 23^{h} 41^{m} 06.91^{s}
- Declination: +00° 18′ 33.33″
- Redshift: 0.276720
- Heliocentric radial velocity: 82,959 ± 4 km/s
- Distance: 3,976.6 ± 278.4 Mly (1,219.24 ± 85.35 Mpc)
- Group or cluster: RX J2341.1+0018
- magnitude (J): 14.83

Characteristics
- Type: Ellip;BrClG NLAGN
- Size: ~667,000 ly (204.5 kpc) (estimated)

Other designations
- 2MASX J23410687+0018332, BZU J2341+0018, LEDA 1162543, NVSS J234106+001833, OGC 123, PKS 2338+000, PMN J2341+0018, RX J2341.1+0018:[REK2022] BCG, WHL J234106.9+001833 BCG

J2341+0018 also known as PKS 2338+000 and OGC 123, is a BL Lacertae object located in the constellation of Pisces. The redshift of the object is (z) 0.276 and it is the brightest cluster galaxy (BCG) of an X-ray galaxy cluster called RX J2341.1+0018.

== Description ==
J2341+0018 is an elliptical galaxy with a radio-loud active galactic nucleus (AGN) and has an R-band luminosity of 12.3 magnitude based on the R-band luminosity estimation made with Sloan Digital Sky Survey (SDSS). It is also an early-type galaxy with a total stellar mass that is estimated to be 10^{11.58} M_{☉} and a total hydrogen-alpha (Hα) star formation of 55.84 M_{☉} per year. The optical spectrum of the galaxy shows the presence of strong emission lines positioned on top of a stellar continuum, thus ruling out the possibility of a blazar source. The lines are significantly broad, with full width at half maximum speeds of up to 1,400 kilometers per second, suggesting the line kinematics are disturbed. The g – r color offset of J2341+0018 is -0.58 magnitude.

The radio source of J2341+0018 has an unresolved appearance. Its spectral energy distribution has a steep radio spectrum at high frequencies, yet also flattening less than a few hundred GHz. The spectral energy distribution of the source has a turnover frequency based on its flux density at 365 MHz. The spectral energy distribution component has parameters of 2.62 ± 0.01, -0.16 ± 0.06 and -0.15 ± 0.04 respectively based on a fit measurement with a low peak gigahertz peaked component.

Further radio imaging of J2341+0018 made with Very Long Baseline Interferometry (VLBI) detected a radio core with an inverted spectrum as well as a radio jet. The core has a total flux density of 70 mJy,while the jet has a flux density of 270 mJy. Most of the radio emission is concentrated inside a component within the central radius of 120 parsecs. The jet on parsec-scales is estimated to have a position angle of 52°, while the median distance between the core and jet components is 5.4 milliarcseconds. A study published in 2022, described J2341+0018 as a weak source with detected variability of 4.5% and has a mean flux density of 98 mJy at 15 GHz.
