= Reversible Michaelis–Menten kinetics =

Enzyme kinetics for reversible reactions

Enzymes are proteins that act as biological catalysts by accelerating chemical reactions. Enzymes act on small molecules called substrates, which an enzyme converts into products. Almost all metabolic processes in the cell need enzyme catalysis in order to occur at rates fast enough to sustain life. The study of how fast an enzyme can transform a substrate into a product is called enzyme kinetics.

The rate of reaction of many chemical reactions shows a linear response as function of the concentration of substrate molecules. Enzymes however display a saturation effect where, as the substrate concentration is increased the reaction rate reaches a maximum value. Standard approaches to describing this behavior are based on models developed by Michaelis and Menten as well and Briggs and Haldane. Most elementary formulations of these models assume that the enzyme reaction is irreversible, that is product is not converted back to substrate. However, this is unrealistic when describing the kinetics of enzymes in an intact cell because there is product available. Reversible Michaelis–Menten kinetics, using the reversible form of the Michaelis–Menten equation, is therefore important when developing computer models of cellular processes involving enzymes.

== Model ==
In enzyme kinetics, the Michaelis–Menten kinetics kinetic rate law that describes the conversion of one substrate to one product, is often commonly depicted in its irreversible form as:

$$v = \frac{V_{\max} s}{K_\mathrm{m} + s}$$

where $v$ is the reaction rate, $V_\max$ is the maximum rate when saturating levels of the substrate are present, $K_\mathrm{m}$ is the Michaelis constant and $s$ the substrate concentration.

In practice, this equation is used to predict the rate of reaction when little or no product is present. Such situations arise in enzyme assays. When used to model enzyme rates in vivo , for example, to model a metabolic pathway, this representation is inadequate because under these conditions product is present. As a result, when building computer models of metabolism or other enzymatic processes, it is better to use the reversible form of the Michaelis–Menten equation.

To model the reversible form of the Michaelis–Menten equation, the following reversible mechanism is considered:

$\ce{{E} + {S} <=>[k_{1}][k_{-1}] ES <=>[k_{2}][k_{-2}] {E} + {P}}$

To derive the rate equation, it is assumed that the concentration of enzyme-substrate complex is at steady-state, that is $des/dt = 0$.

Following current literature convention, we will be using lowercase Roman lettering to indicate concentrations (this avoids cluttering the equations with square brackets). Thus $es$ indicates the concentration of enzyme-substrate complex, ES.

The net rate of change of product (which is equal to $v$) is given by the difference in forward and reverse rates:

$v = v_f - v_r = k_2 es -k_{-2} e\ p$

The total level of enzyme moiety is the sum total of free enzyme and enzyme-complex, that is $e_t = e + es$. Hence the level of free $e$ is given by the difference in the total enzyme concentration, $e_t$ and the concentration of complex, that is:

$e = e_t - es$

Using mass conservation we can compute the rate of change of $es$ using the balance equation:

$\frac{des}{dt}=k_{1}\left(e_t - es\right) s + k_{-2}\left(e_t - es\right) p - \left(k_{-1}+k_{2}\right) es =0$

where $e$ has been replaced using $e = e_t - es$. This leaves $es$ as the only unknown. Solving for $es$ gives:

$es = \frac{\mathrm{e_t}\left( k_1 s + k_{-2}\ p\right)}{k_{-1} + k_{2} + k_1\ s + k_{-2}\ p}$

Inserting $es$ into the rate equation $v = k_2 es -k_{-2} e\ p$ and rearranging gives:

$v=e_t \frac{k_1 k_2 s - k_{-1} k_{-2} p}{k_{-1}+k_2+k_1 s + k_{-2} p}$

The following substitutions are now made:

$k_{2} = \frac{V^f_{\max}}{e_t}; \quad K^s_m = \frac{k_{-1}+k_2}{k_1}$

and

$k_{-1} = \frac{V^r_{\max}}{e_t}; \quad K^p_{m}=\frac{k_{-1}+k_2}{k_{-2}}$

after rearrangement, we obtain the reversible Michaelis–Menten equation in terms of four constants:

$v=\frac{\frac{V^f_{\max}}{K^s_m} s-\frac{V^r_{\max}}{K_m^p} p}{1+\frac{s}{K_m^s}+\frac{p}{K_m^p}}$

== Haldane relationship ==
This is not the usual form in which the equation is used. Instead, the equation is set to zero, meaning $v= 0$, indicating we are at equilibrium and the concentrations $s$ and $p$ are now equilibrium concentrations, hence:

$0=V^f_{\max} s_{eq} / K^s_m- V^r_{\max} p_{eq} / K^p_m$

Rearranging this gives the so-called Haldane relationship:

$K_{eq}=\frac{p_{eq}}{s_{eq}}=\frac{V^f_{\max} K^p_m}{V^r_{\max} K^s_m}$

The advantage of this is that one of the four constants can be eliminated and replaced with the equilibrium constant which is more likely to be known. In addition, it allows one to make a useful interpretation in terms of the thermodynamic and saturation effects (see next section). Most often the reverse maximum rate is eliminated to yield the final equation:

$v=\frac{V^f_{\max} / K^S_m\left(s - p / K_{eq}\right)}{1 + s / K^s_m + p / K^p_m}$

== Decomposition of the rate law ==
The reversible Michaelis–Menten law, as with many enzymatic rate laws, can be decomposed into a capacity term, a thermodynamic term, and an enzyme saturation level. This is more easily seen when we write the reversible rate law as:

$v=V^f_{\max} \cdot \left(s- p / K_{eq}\right) \cdot \frac{1}{1+ s / K^s_m + p / K^p_m}$

where $V^f_{\max}$ is the capacity term, $\left(s- p/K_{eq}\right)$ the thermodynamic term and

$\frac{1}{1+ s / K^s_m + p / K^p_m}$

the saturation term. The separation can be even better appreciated if we look at the elasticity coefficient $\varepsilon^v_s$. According to elasticity algebra, the elasticity of a product is the sum of the sub-term elasticities, that is:

$\varepsilon^{a b}_x = \varepsilon^a_x + \varepsilon^b_x$

Hence the elasticity of the reversible Michaelis–Menten rate law can easily be shown to be:

$\varepsilon^{v}_s = \varepsilon^{v_{cap}}_s + \varepsilon^{v_{thermo}}_s + \varepsilon^{v_{sat}}_s$

Since the capacity term is a constant, the first elasticity is zero. The thermodynamic term can be easily shown to be:

$\varepsilon^{v_{thermo}}_s = \frac{1}{1 - \rho}$

where $\rho$ is the disequilibrium ratio and equals $\Gamma/K_{eq}$ and $\Gamma$ the mass–action ratio

The saturation term becomes:

$\varepsilon^{v_{sat}}_s = \frac{-s / K^s_m}{1+ s / K^s_m + p / K^p_m}$
