= George Edward Briggs =

British botanist (1893–1985)

George Edward Briggs FRS
- Briggs in 1936
- Born: 25 June 1893; Grimsby, Lincolnshire
- Died: 7 February 1985 (aged 91)
- Scientific career
- Fields: Botany
- Author abbrev. (botany): G.E.Briggs

George Edward Briggs FRS (25 June 1893 – 7 February 1985) was professor of botany at the University of Cambridge.

== Early life and education ==
He was born in Grimsby, Lincolnshire, the eldest son of Walker Thomas and Susan (née Townend) Briggs. He attended Wintringham secondary school.

== Career ==
He was elected a Fellow of the Royal Society in 1935. He published several significant scientific papers on enzymes. Part of his work on enzymes was done with J. B. S. Haldane, and led to the derivation of Victor Henri's enzyme kinetics law and Michaelis–Menten kinetics via the steady state approximation. This derivation remains commonly used today because it provides better insight into the system, though it retains the algebraic form of the Michaelis-Menten equations. Notable publications of Briggs include Movement of Water in Plants.

The obituary of Briggs in Biographical Memoirs of the Fellows of the Royal Society, written by Rutherford Robertson (1986), describes his lecturing style:

To the ordinary student Briggs’s lectures were not inspiring. They were not easy to follow; a man with one of the quickest minds of his generation might be excused for failing to realize that most members of his audience could not keep up with the speed of his thinking ... The lectures were for those who appreciated the originality of his critical thought, not for those who wanted to be spoon-fed on ‘facts’; he provided a sound training in a critical approach"

== Personal life ==
Briggs was married with two children. He was described in his obituary as

"hard to live near or with at times. His daughter remembers how much was expected of her when she was a child. I remember his stern criticism of his son, then aged about 12, when his model theatre (really very good) did not work perfectly, and of his wife because he thought there was something wrong with the tea on a Sunday afternoon — though the guests could not detect anything. Part and parcel of the drive was irascibility and shortness, with an explosive quality."

He was shy, with an "earthy" sense of humour. He described himself as "lucky" and "counted himself fortunate that he had such good parents and an educational authority and a university that gave him the opportunity to rise by merit". He died in 1985.
