= Michaelis–Menten–Monod kinetics =

Michaelis–Menten–Monod (MMM) kinetics involves the coupling of an enzyme-driven chemical reaction of the Michaelis–Menten type with the Monod growth of an organism that performs the chemical reaction. The enzyme-driven reaction can be conceptualized as the binding of an enzyme E with the substrate S to form an intermediate complex C, which releases the reaction product P and the unchanged enzyme E. During the metabolic consumption of S, biomass B is produced, which synthesizes the enzyme, thus feeding back to the chemical reaction. The two processes can be expressed as

$\ce{{S} + {E} <=>[{k}_{1}][{k}_{-1}] {C} ->[{k}] {P} + {E}}$	1

$\ce{{S} ->[{Y}] {B} ->[{z}] {E}}$	2

where $k_1$ and $k_{-1}$ are the forward and backward equilibrium rate constants, $k$ is the reaction rate constant for product release, $Y$ is the biomass yield coefficient, and $z$ is the enzyme yield coefficient.

== Transient kinetics ==
The kinetic equations describing the reactions above can be derived from the GEBIK equations and are written as

$\frac{\text{d}[S]}{\text{d}t} = -k_1[S][E] + k_{-1}[C],$	3a

$\frac{\text{d}[C]}{\text{d}t} = k_1[S][E] - k_{-1}[C] - k[C],$	3b

$\frac{\text{d}[P]}{\text{d}t} = k[C],$	3c

$\frac{\text{d}[B]}{\text{d}t} = - Y \frac{\text{d}[S]}{\text{d}t} - \mu_B [B],$	3d

$\frac{\text{d}[E]}{\text{d}t} = - zY \frac{\text{d}[S]}{\text{d}t} - \frac{\text{d}[C]}{\text{d}t} - \mu_E [E],$	3e

where $\mu_B$ is the biomass mortality rate and $\mu_E$ is the enzyme degradation rate. These equations describe the full transient kinetics, but cannot be normally constrained to experiments because the complex C is difficult to measure and there is no clear consensus on whether it actually exists.

== Quasi-steady-state kinetics ==
Equations 3 can be simplified by using the quasi-steady-state (QSS) approximation, that is, for $\frac{\text{d}[C]}{\text{d}t} = 0$; under the QSS, the kinetic equations describing the MMM problem become

$\frac{\text{d}[S]}{\text{d}t} = -k [E]\frac{[S]}{K+[S]} ,$	4a

$\frac{\text{d}[P]}{\text{d}t} = -\frac{\text{d}[S]}{\text{d}t},$	4b

$\frac{\text{d}[B]}{\text{d}t} = - Y \frac{\text{d}[S]}{\text{d}t} - \mu_B [B],$	4c

$\frac{\text{d}[E]}{\text{d}t} = - zY \frac{\text{d}[S]}{\text{d}t} - \mu_E [E],$	4d

where $K = (k_{-1} +k)/k_1$ is the Michaelis–Menten constant (also known as the half-saturation concentration and affinity).

== Implicit analytic solution ==
If one hypothesizes that the enzyme is produced at a rate proportional to the biomass production and degrades at a rate proportional to the biomass mortality, then Eqs. 4 can be rewritten as

$\frac{\text{d}[P]}{\text{d}t} = k [E]\frac{[S]}{K+[S]} ,$	4a

$\frac{\text{d}[S]}{\text{d}t} = -\frac{\text{d}[P]}{\text{d}t},$	4b

$\frac{\text{d}[B]}{\text{d}t} = Y \frac{\text{d}[P]}{\text{d}t} - \mu_B [B],$	4c

$\frac{\text{d}[E]}{\text{d}t} = - z \frac{\text{d}[B]}{\text{d}t} ,$	4d

where $S$, $P$, $E$, $B$ are explicit function of time $t$. Note that Eq. (4b) and (4d) are linearly dependent on Eqs. (4a) and (4c), which are the two differential equations that can be used to solve the MMM problem. An implicit analytic solution can be obtained if $P$ is chosen as the independent variable and $t(P)$, $S(P)$, $E(P)$ and $B(P$) are rewritten as functions of $P$ so to obtain

$\frac{\text{d}t(P)}{\text{d}P} = \left(k z B(P)\frac{S_0 -P}{K +S_0 -P} \right)^{-1},$	5a

$\frac{\text{d}B(P)}{\text{d}P} = Y - \mu_B B(P) \frac{\text{d}t(P)}{\text{d}P},$	5b

where $S(t)$ has been substituted by $S(P)= S_0 -P$ as per mass balance $S_0 +P_0 = S+P$, with the initial value $S_0 = S(P)$ when $P=P_0=0$, and where $E(t)$ has been substituted by $zB(P)$ as per the linear relation $E = z B$ expressed by Eq. (4d). The analytic solution to Eq. (5b) is

$B(P) = B_0+ \left(Y -\frac{\mu_B }{k z}\right) P + \frac{ \mu_BK }{k z}\ln\left( 1-\frac{P}{S_0} \right) ,$	6

with the initial biomass concentration $B_0 = B(P)$ when $P=0$. To avoid the solution of a transcendental function, a polynomial Taylor expansion to the second-order in $P$ is used for $B(P)$ in Eq. (6) as

$B(P) = B_0 + \left(Y -\frac{\mu_B }{zk} - \frac{\mu_B K}{zkS_0} \right)P - \frac{\mu_B K}{2 zk S_0^2 } P^2 +O(P^3)$	7

Substituting Eq. (7) into Eq. (5a} and solving for $t(P)$ with the initial value $t(P=0) = 0$, one obtains the implicit solution for $t(P)$ as

$t(P) = -\frac{F'}{2} \ln \left( \frac{ \sqrt{Q}+2HP+M }{ \sqrt{Q}-2HP-M } \right) - \frac{ K }{ 2N'}\ln\left(\frac{(S_0-P)^2}{HP^2 +MP+N }\right) + \frac{F'}{2} \ln\left( \frac{ \sqrt{Q}+M }{ \sqrt{Q} -M } \right) - \frac{ K }{ 2N'}\ln\left(\frac{S_0^2}{N }\right).$	8

with the constants

$H = -\mu_B K/2S_0^2 < 0,$	9a

$M = k zY -\mu_B - \frac{\mu_B K}{S_0}, N = k z B_0 > 0,$	9b

$M' = -(M+2HS_0), N' = N + M S_0 + H S_0^2 \neq 0,$	9c

$-Q =4HN-M^2 \ne 0,$	9d

$F = \frac{2}{\sqrt{-Q}} - \frac{KM'}{N'\sqrt{-Q}}, F' = \frac{2}{\sqrt{Q}} - \frac{KM'}{N'\sqrt{Q}},$	9e

For any chosen value of $P$, the biomass concentration can be calculated with Eq. (7) at a time $t(P)$ given by Eq. (8). The corresponding values of $S(P) = S_0-P$ and $E(P) = zB(P)$ can be determined using the mass balances introduced above.

== See also ==
- Enzyme kinetics
- Michaelis–Menten kinetics
- Monod
- GEBIK equations
