= Maud Menten =

Canadian physician and chemist (1879–1960)

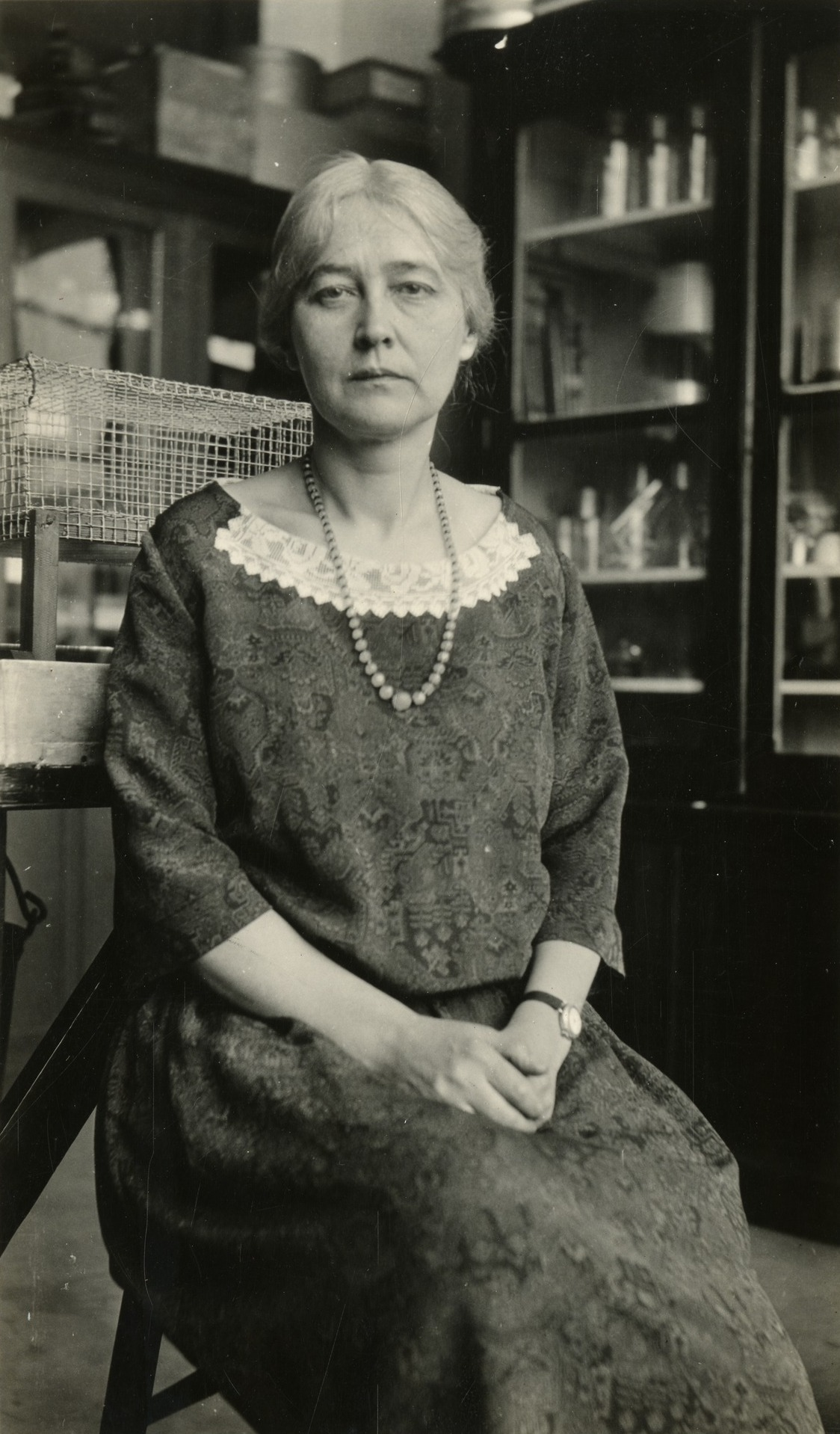
- Born: March 20, 1879; Port Lambton, Ontario, Canada
- Died: July 17, 1960 (aged 81); Leamington, Ontario, Canada
- Education: University of Toronto (B.A., M.B., M.D.), University of Chicago (PhD)
- Known for: Michaelis-Menten equation, inventing the azo-dye coupling reaction, electrophoretic separation of blood haemoglobin proteins, contributions to enzyme kinetics and histochemistry
- Scientific career
- Institutions: University of Toronto, Canada; Rockefeller Institute for Medical Research, US; New York Infirmary for Women and Children, US; University of Berlin, Germany; University of Chicago, US; University of Pittsburgh, US; British Columbia Medical Research Institute, Canada
- Thesis: The Alkalinity of the Blood in Malignancy and Other Pathological Conditions; Together with Observations on the Relation of the Alkalinity of the Blood to Barometric Pressure (1916)

Maud Leonora Menten (March 20, 1879 – July 17, 1960) was a Canadian physician and chemist. As a bio-medical and medical researcher, she made significant contributions to enzyme kinetics and histochemistry, and invented a procedure that remains in use. She is primarily known for her work with Leonor Michaelis on enzyme kinetics in 1913. The paper has been translated from its written language of German into English.

Maud Menten was born in Port Lambton, Ontario and studied medicine at the University of Toronto (B.A. 1904, M.B. 1907, M.D. 1911). She was among the first women in Canada to earn a medical doctorate.

Since women were not allowed to participate in research in Canada at the time, Menten looked elsewhere to continue her work. In 1912, she moved to Berlin where she worked with Leonor Michaelis and co-authored their paper in Biochemische Zeitschrift, demonstrating that the rate of an enzyme-catalyzed reaction is proportional to the amount of the enzyme-substrate complex. This relationship between reaction rate and enzyme–substrate concentration is known as the Michaelis–Menten equation.

After working with Michaelis in Germany she entered graduate school at the University of Chicago where she obtained her Ph.D. in 1916. Her dissertation was entitled "The Alkalinity of the Blood in Malignancy and Other Pathological Conditions; Together with Observations on the Relation of the Alkalinity of the Blood to Barometric Pressure".

Menten joined the faculty of the University of Pittsburgh in 1923 and remained there until her retirement in 1950. She became an assistant professor and then an associate professor in the School of Medicine and was the head of pathology at the Children's Hospital of Pittsburgh. Her final promotion to full professor, in 1948, was at the age of 69 in the last year of her career. Her final academic post was as a research fellow at the British Columbia Medical Research Institute.

== Early life ==
Menten was born on 20 March 1879 in Port Lambton, Ontario, the eldest of two children of Charles William Menten and Emma Trusler. Her father worked as a river pilot and boat operator, while her mother was involved in managing family business ventures including a hotel and general store.

In 1889, when Menten was ten years old, the family moved west to the Harrison River region of British Columbia. Her father served as postmaster at Harrison Mills and operated boats on the nearby Fraser River, while her mother helped run the family’s hotel and store. Harrison Mills was a small river transport settlement at the junction of the Fraser and Harrison rivers, where riverboats carried passengers, freight, and mail through the Fraser Valley.

Menten spent much of her childhood in this frontier environment. She grew up among both settler and Indigenous communities of the Fraser Valley, particularly Stó:lō peoples, and learned Chinook Jargon, a trade language widely used throughout the Pacific Northwest during the late nineteenth century.

== Early work ==
After completing secondary school, Menten attended the University of Toronto where she earned a bachelor of arts degree in 1904 and a master's degree in physiology in 1907. While earning her graduate degree, she worked as a demonstrator in the physiology laboratory at the university.

Menten wanted to further her medical research, but found that opportunities for women in Canada were scarce at the time. As a result, she accepted a fellowship at the Rockefeller Institute for Medical Research and left Canada, arriving in New York City in 1907. There she studied the effect of radium bromide on cancerous tumors in rats. Menten and two other scientists published the results of their experiment, authoring the first monograph published by Rockefeller Institute. Menten worked as an intern at the New York Infirmary for Women and Children. After a year at the Institute, Menten returned to Canada and began her studies at the University of Toronto where, in 1911, she became one of the first Canadian women to qualify as a medical doctor.

== The Michaelis-Menten Equation ==
In 1912, Menten returned to medical research, working with renowned surgeon George Crile, in whose honour the Crile crater on the Moon is named. Their work concentrated on the control of acid-base balance during anaesthesia. Around this time she became acquainted with Leonor Michaelis, who was one of the world's leading experts in pH and buffers. Menten became attracted to early work of Michaelis in enzyme kinetics. Despite his modest laboratory establishment in Berlin, she made the difficult decision to cross the sea to work with Michaelis.

Michaelis and Menten used an equation to express the relationship they were investigating:

$$v = \frac{Va}{K_\mathrm{m} + a}$$

for a steady-state rate $v$ in terms of the substrate concentration $a$ and constants $V$ and $K_\mathrm{m}$ (written with modern symbols). A decade earlier, Victor Henri had included an equivalent equation in his doctoral thesis, but he did not appreciate the importance of the steady state nor the simplification that would result from considering the initial rate, and did not use it. The equation shows not only that each enzyme is specific for its substrate, but also that the rate of reaction rate increases to saturation as the substrate concentration increases. The constant $K_\mathrm{m}$ used in expressing this rate is now called the Michaelis constant. The paper deriving the Michaelis–Menten equation is Menten's most famous work.

== Other work ==
After her research in Berlin, Menten enrolled in University of Chicago, where in 1916, she obtained a Ph.D. in biochemistry. In 1923, she still could not find an academic position for a woman in Canada; she took a position as part of the faculty of the medical school at the University of Pittsburgh while serving as a clinical pathologist at Children's Hospital in Pittsburgh. Despite the demands both jobs had, Menten found time to maintain an active research program, authoring or coauthoring more than 70 publications. Although her promotion from assistant to associate professor was timely, she was not made a full professor until she was 70 years old, within one year of her retirement.

As part of extensive work on alkaline phosphatase, Menten invented the azo-dye coupling reaction, which is still used in histochemistry. This was described in a major textbook of the 1950s in the following terms:

It is not too much to say that the use of this principle was a stroke of genius.

She characterised bacterial toxins from B. paratyphosus, Streptococcus scarlatina, and Salmonella ssp. that were used in a successful immunisation program against scarlet fever in Pittsburgh in the 1930s and 1940s. She also conducted the first electrophoretic separation of blood haemoglobin proteins in 1944. In this she anticipated the results of Linus Pauling and his collaborators by several years; however, he is usually credited with the discovery.

Menten also worked on the properties of hemoglobin, regulation of blood sugar level, and kidney function.

She continued to work on cancer, especially in children, as well as other illnesses of children.

After her retirement from the University of Pittsburgh in 1950, she returned to Canada where she continued to do cancer research at the British Columbia Medical Research Institute (1951–1953).

Poor health forced Menten's retirement in 1955, and she died July 17, 1960, at the age of 81, in Leamington, Ontario.

== Personal life ==
Rebecca Skloot portrays Menten as a petite dynamo of a woman who wore "Paris hats, blue dresses with stained-glass hues, and Buster Brown shoes". She drove a Model T Ford through the University of Pittsburgh area for some 32 years and enjoyed many adventurous and artistic hobbies. She played the clarinet, created paintings worthy of art exhibitions, climbed mountains, went on an Arctic expedition, and enjoyed astronomy. By the time of her death, she had mastered several languages, including Russian, French, German, Italian, and at least one First Nations language, Halkomelem. Although Menten did most of her research in the United States, she retained her Canadian citizenship throughout her life.

== Honors ==
Throughout her career Menten was affiliated with many scientific societies.

At Menten's death, colleagues Aaron H. Stock and Anna-Mary Carpenter honored the Canadian biochemist in an obituary in Nature: "Menten was untiring in her efforts on behalf of sick children. She was an inspiring teacher who stimulated medical students, resident physicians, and research associates to their best efforts. She will long be remembered by her associates for her keen mind, for a certain dignity of manner, for unobtrusive modesty, for her wit, and above all for her enthusiasm for research."

In 1998, she was posthumously inducted into the Canadian Medical Hall of Fame. She also was honored at the University of Toronto with a plaque. At the University of Pittsburgh she was honored with a named chair and memorial lectures. Port Lambton, Canada, where Menten was born, installed a commemorative bronze plaque about her in 2015.

== See also ==
- Timeline of women in science
