= Turnover number =

In chemistry, number related to catalysis

In chemistry, the term "turnover number" has two distinct meanings.

In enzymology, the turnover number (k_{cat}) is defined as the limiting number of chemical conversions of substrate molecules per second that a single active site will execute for a given enzyme concentration [E_{T}] for enzymes with two or more active sites. For enzymes with a single active site, k_{cat} is referred to as the catalytic constant. It can be calculated from the limiting reaction rate V_{max} and catalyst site concentration e_{0} as follows:

$$k_\mathrm{cat} = \frac{V_\max}{e_0}$$
(See Michaelis–Menten kinetics).

In other chemical fields, such as organometallic catalysis, turnover number (TON) has a different meaning: the number of moles of substrate that a mole of catalyst can convert before becoming inactivated:

$$\mathrm{TON} = \frac{n_\mathrm{product}}{n_\mathrm{cat}}$$

An ideal catalyst would have an infinite turnover number in this sense, because it would never be consumed. The term turnover frequency (TOF) is used to refer to the turnover per unit time, equivalent to the meaning of turnover number in enzymology.

$$\mathrm{TOF} = \frac{\mathrm{TON}}{t}$$

For most relevant industrial applications, the turnover frequency is in the range of 10^{−2} – 10^{2} s^{−1} (10^{3} – 10^{7} s^{−1} for enzymes). The enzyme catalase has the largest turnover frequency, with values up to 4×10^{7} s^{−1} having been reported.

== Turnover number of diffusion-limited enzymes ==
Acetylcholinesterase is a serine hydrolase with a reported catalytic constant greater than 10^{4} s^{−1}. This implies that this enzyme reacts with acetylcholine at close to the diffusion-limited rate.

Carbonic anhydrase is one of the fastest enzymes, and its rate is typically limited by the diffusion rate of its substrates. Typical catalytic constants for the different forms of this enzyme range between 10^{4} s^{−1} and 10^{6} s^{−1}.

== See also ==
- Catalysis
