= Monod equation =

Empirical model for microorganisms growth limited by a nutrient

The Monod equation is a mathematical model for the growth of microorganisms. It is named for French biochemist Jacques Monod, who proposed using an equation of this form to relate microbial growth rates in an aqueous environment to the concentration of a limiting nutrient. The Monod equation has the same form as the Michaelis–Menten equation, but differs in that it is empirical while the latter is based on theoretical considerations.

The Monod equation is commonly used in environmental engineering. For example, it is used in the activated sludge model for sewage treatment.

== Equation ==
The growth rate μ of a considered micro-organism as a function of the limiting substrate concentration [S]

The empirical Monod equation is

$$\mu = \mu_\max \frac{[S]}{K_s + [S]}$$

where:

μ is the growth rate of a considered microorganism,
μ_{max} is the maximum growth rate of this microorganism,
[S] is the concentration of the limiting substrate S for growth,
K_{s} is the "half-velocity constant"—the value of [S] when μ/μ_{max} = 0.5.

μ_{max} and K_{s} are empirical (experimental) coefficients to the Monod equation. They will differ between microorganism species and will also depend on the ambient environmental conditions, e.g., on the temperature, on the pH of the solution, and on the composition of the culture medium.

== Application notes ==
The rate of substrate utilization is related to the specific growth rate as

$$r_s = \mu X/Y,$$

where

X is the total biomass (since the specific growth rate μ is normalized to the total biomass),
Y is the yield coefficient.

r_{s} is negative by convention.

In some applications, several terms of the form [S] / (K_{s} + [S]) are multiplied together where more than one nutrient or growth factor has the potential to be limiting (e.g. organic matter and oxygen are both necessary to heterotrophic bacteria). When the yield coefficient, being the ratio of mass of microorganisms to mass of substrate utilized, becomes very large, this signifies that there is deficiency of substrate available for utilization.

== Graphical determination of constants ==
As with the Michaelis–Menten equation graphical methods may be used to fit the coefficients of the Monod equation:

- Eadie–Hofstee diagram
- Hanes–Woolf plot
- Lineweaver–Burk plot

== See also ==
- Activated sludge model (uses the Monod equation to model bacterial growth and substrate utilization)
- Bacterial growth
- Hill equation (biochemistry)
- Hill contribution to Langmuir equation
- Langmuir adsorption model (equation with the same mathematical form)
- Michaelis–Menten kinetics (equation with the same mathematical form)
- Gompertz function
- Victor Henri, who first wrote the general equation form in 1901
- Von Bertalanffy function
