= Victor Henri =

French physical chemist and physiologist

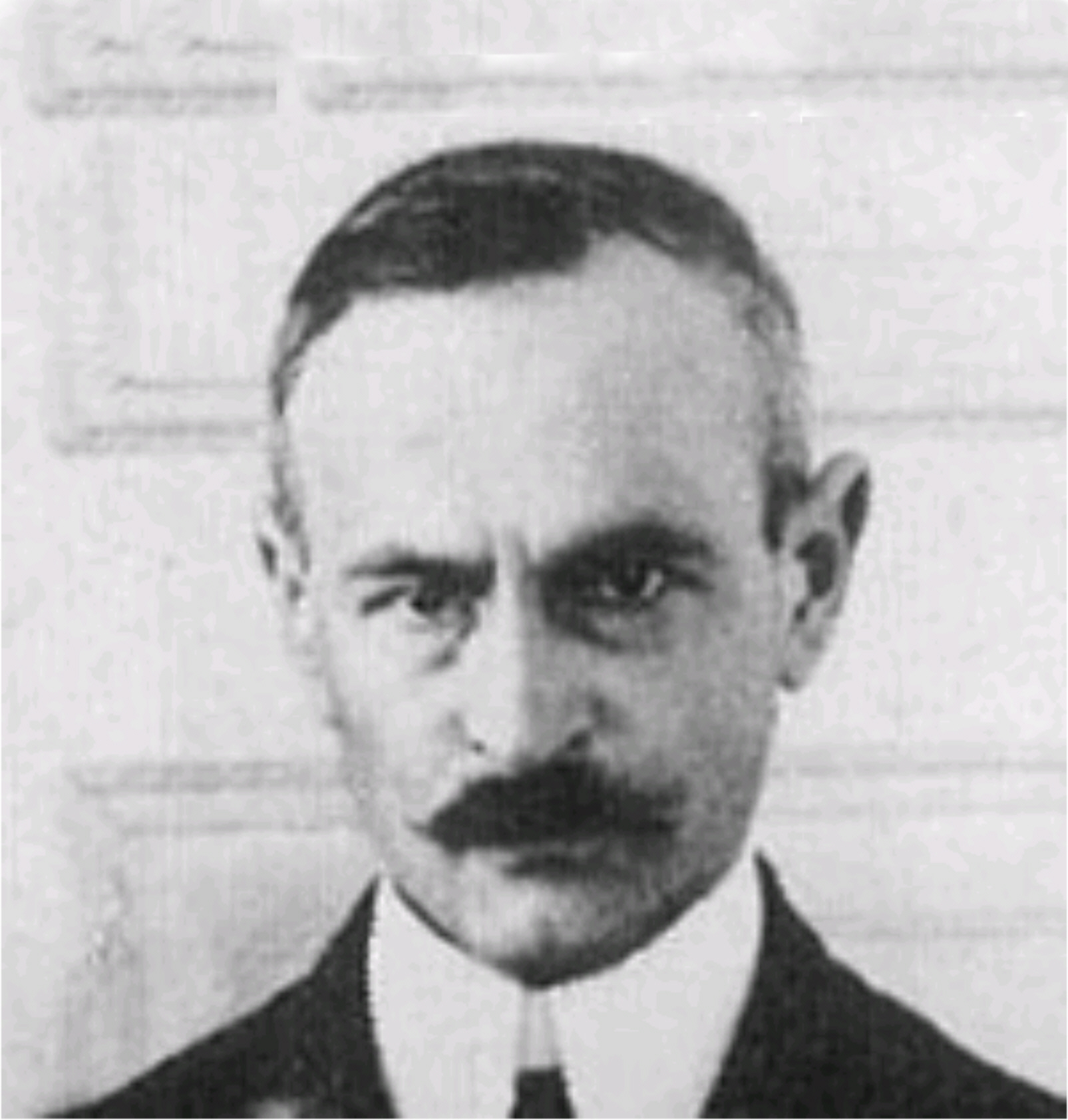
- Born: 6 June 1872; Marseille, France
- Died: 21 June 1940 (aged 68); La Rochelle, France
- Citizenship: France
- Education: University of Paris (Sorbonne), PhD 1903; University of Göttingen (PhD, 1897)
- Relatives: Aleksey Krylov (half-brother); Aleksandr Mikhailovich Lyapunov, Sergei Mikhailovich Lyapunov, Boris Mikhailovich Lyapunov (first cousins once removed)
- Scientific career
- Fields: Physical chemistry, physiology, physiological psychology
- Workplaces: University of Paris, University of Göttingen, University of Leipzig, Université de Liège

Victor Henri (6 June 1872 – 21 June 1940) was a French-Russian physical chemist and physiologist. He was born in Marseilles as a son of Russian parents. He is known mainly as an early pioneer in enzyme kinetics. He published more than 500 papers in a variety of disciplines including biochemistry, physical chemistry, psychology, and physiology. Aleksey Krylov was his half-brother.

== Life ==
Victor Henri's parents were Aleksandra Viktorovna Lyapunova and Nikolay Alexandrovich Krylov, who were not married. His father was married to his mother's sister, Sofiya Viktorovna. At that time, an illegitimate child had no rights if born in Russia, but France was different: if born in France one would be a French citizen. So his parents traveled to Marseilles for his birth. After Victor Henri was born there, Krylov and his legitimate wife then adopted him, and took him back to Saint Petersburg, where he lived with his father, his biological mother, and his adoptive mother. He attended a German secondary school in Saint Petersburg.

Birth certificate: Notice the annotation "parents inconnus" ("unknown parents") and the signature of Melchior Guinot, the mayor of Marseilles

His biological mother and her sister who adopted him were first cousins of three notable persons: Aleksandr Mikhailovich Lyapunov, a mathematician who did pioneering work in stability theory, remembered today in the Lyapunov exponent; Sergei Mikhailovich Lyapunov, a composer; and Boris Mikhailovich Lyapunov (in Russian), who is well known in Russia as an expert in Slavic languages.

In 1891, Henri entered the Sorbonne University in Paris, where he received an education in mathematics and, later, in Natural Sciences. After finishing university, he became intrigued by philosophy and psychology.

Henri was awarded two Ph.D. degrees: first in psychology in 1897 at the University of Göttingen, and second, in physical chemistry in 1903 in Paris. In 1930, he was appointed full professor of physical chemistry at the University of Liège (Belgium).

== Work ==
At the beginning of his career Henri worked with Alfred Binet on psychology, including study of whether different degrees of intellectual effort had any physiological effect on the composition of the excretion products of subjects with a controlled diet and controlled muscular activity, which he called “nutritional exchanges”. However, he is far better known for his work on enzymes and physical chemistry after 1900.

In common with several other researchers at that time, Henri studied invertase, an enzyme that catalyses the hydrolysis of sucrose to glucose and fructose, with a view to deriving a general rate law for enzymes.

Adrian John Brown, Professor of Malting and Brewing at the University of Birmingham, suggested that enzyme saturation could be understood in terms of formation of a bond between the enzyme and the substrate. Following this, and inspired by discussions with German physical chemist Max Bodenstein, Henri published the fundamental equation of enzyme kinetics for the first time. He wrote it as follows:

(1) $\frac{dx}{dt} = \frac{K \cdot \Phi \cdot (a-x)}{1+m\cdot (a-x)+n \cdot x}$

where $a$ and $x$ denote the initial concentration of substrate and the concentration of product formed, respectively. The other symbols represent constants. In modern notation, it may be written as

(2) $v = V \cdot \dfrac{S}{1 + \dfrac{S}{K_1} + \dfrac{P}{K_2}}\$

where $v$, $S$ and $P$ denote the reaction velocity and the substrate and product concentrations, respectively. $K_1$ and $K_2$ stand for the dissociation constants of the enzyme-substrate-complex and enzyme–product complex, respectively, and $V$ is a constant.

It took about ten years before biochemists realized the full significance of this equation. In particular, Henri's work was extended by the German biochemist Leonor Michaelis and the Canadian physician Maud Menten. They investigated invertase (saccharase) as well. In a seminal paper in 1913, they derived the equation in more detail and interpreted it more profoundly. In particular, they interpreted the constants in the equation correctly and comprehensively. In particular, they recognized that considering the behaviour in the steady state at zero time with $P$ = 0 would lead to simpler and more easily interpretable results, and thus paved the way for general applications.

In most cases, the equation is used for the special case $P$ = 0 and it is usually called the Michaelis-Menten equation, and sometimes the Henri-Michaelis-Menten equation. Deichmann et al. (2013) have suggested that the term Henri's equation should be used for equation (2) in the case in which $P > 0$.

Serge Nicolas wrote a comprehensive biographical article (in French) on Henri, and a recent discussion of Henri's place in the history of enzyme kinetics, including an English translation of his thesis, is available.
