= Binding =

Binding generally means tying or associating multiple things together.

Binding may refer to:

== Crafts ==
- Binding (woodworking), an inlaid edging, often used to reduce fluctuations in the wood's humidity
- Bookbinding, the protective cover of a book and the art of its construction
  - Coil binding or spiral binding, is a commonly used book binding style for documents
  - Comb binding, cerlox or surelox binding, a method of binding pages into a book
- Binding agent
- Binding barrel
- Binding joist

=== Textiles ===
- Binding (knitting), a type of gather also known as a pullover stitch
- Binding (sewing), a finish to a seam or hem
- Binding knot, a knot used to keep objects together
- Binding off, in knitting, a family of techniques for ending a column of stitches

== Computing ==
- Binding, associating a network socket with a local port number and IP address
- Data binding, the technique of connecting two data elements together
  - UI data binding, linking a user interface element to an element of a domain model, such as a database field
  - XML data binding, representing XML document data using objects and classes
- Key binding, or keyboard shortcut, mapping key combinations to software functionality
- Language binding, a library providing a functional interface to second library in a different programming language
- Name binding, the association of code or data with an identifier in a programming language
  - Late binding, name binding which is resolved at run-time rather than in pre-execution time
- Dynamic dispatch
  - Dynamic linker
    - Prebinding
- Binding time
- Binding properties pattern
- Binding neuron

== Science ==
- Binding problem, a term for several problems in cognitive science and philosophy
  - Neural binding, synchronous activity of neurons and neuronal ensembles
- Molecular binding, an attractive interaction between two molecules
  - Ligand (biochemistry) § Receptor/ligand binding affinity
  - Binding coefficient
  - Binding constant
  - Binding domain
  - Binding protein
  - Binding selectivity
  - Binding site
  - BindingDB, an online database of measured binding affinities
- Binding potential
- Binding energy, the amount of energy required to separate particles
- Binding (linguistics), the distribution of pronouns etc. to identify syntactic relationships
  - Government and binding theory

== Law ==
- Binding precedent, a legal decision that must be applied or followed
- Legally binding, enforceable by law
- Binding to the peace (disambiguation)
- See also Binding Triad (AKA World Parliament), a proposal to amend the United Nations Charter

== Religion ==
- Binding of Isaac (Hebrew: עֲקֵדַת יִצְחָק, romanized: ʿAqēḏaṯ Yiṣḥāq), or simply The Binding, is a story of the Book of Genesis in the Hebrew Bible and Old Testament
- Binding of Ishmael (Arabic: عَقْد إِسْمَاعِيل, romanized: ʿAqd Ismāʿīl; AKA dhabih), a narrative in Islamic tradition
- Binding and loosing, in both the Targum and the New Testament, forbidding and permitting an action, respectively
- Binding of evil, in Indo-European culture
- Binding of the Years, an Aztec tradition
- Curse tablet (Latin: tabella defixionis, defixio; Greek: κατάδεσμος, romanized: katadesmos); both the Latin and Greek words are derived from terms meaning 'to bind'

== Human body attachment/modification ==
- Breast binding or chest binding, a wrapping to form a bra-like structure
- Foot binding, a Chinese custom practiced on young girls from the 10th to early 20th centuries
- Ski binding, an attachment which anchors a ski boot to the ski
- Snowboard binding, a device for connecting a foot to a snowboard

== People ==
- Carly Binding (born 1978), New Zealand pop singer-songwriter
- Karl Binding (1841–1920), German jurist
- Lee Binding (born 1975), graphic designer
- Lothar Binding (born 1950), German politician
- Rudolf G. Binding (1867–1938), German writer and supporter of Adolf Hitler

== Other uses ==
- Binding Brauerei, a brewery in Frankfurt, Germany
- Egg binding, a difficulty in animal egg-laying
- The Binding (2016 film), an American psychological thriller film
- The Binding (2020 film), an Italian film
- Binding commitment
- Binding constraint, in mathematics
- Binding post, in electronics

== See also ==
- Bind (disambiguation)
- Binder (disambiguation)
- Bound (disambiguation)
