= Video game manual =

Instructions included in video game packaging

A video game manual (occasionally referred to as an instruction manual or instruction booklet) is a document contained within a video game providing guidance on how to play the game. As part of video game packaging, a manual may be small or large in size. The use of manuals to convey information about gameplay declined over time as other sources of information became more accessible, including the Internet.

== Features ==
=== Form ===
Manuals can take many forms. For computer software, a "compact" manual is a smaller booklet designed to sit in the jewel case containing a compact disc, containing up to 24 pages. A "tome" is a larger booklet typically packaged in the box. Some manuals took the form of bound books, as with the manual of Falcon 4.0, contained in a 716-page binder.

=== Content ===
Manuals can provide hardware information, including guidance on controls. Some contain empty pages for players to take notes. Manuals often are used to contain boilerplate legal information about the game including relevant copyrights and trademarks and relevant consumer warranties. They may also contain the credits of staff who created the game.

== Other uses ==
=== Narrative ===
The content of a manual may also include paratextual material providing written accompaniment to the game's narrative, characters or setting. Some manuals contain mixed media elements, including comic strips, as in F-Zero and in the Metal Gear Solid series. Others may be designed diegetically to present themselves as a document in the world of the game; for instance, Fallout presents its manual as a survival guide, and games in the Grand Theft Auto series present their manuals as a tourist guide.

=== Copy protection ===
Physical manuals were used in early games as a form of copy protection. Games referred players to a code or phrase in the manual, or a product key, as a method of demonstrating ownership of the game. The manual was used as a copy protection mechanism during a time when it was assumed that it was more difficult to copy and distribute a print manual as opposed to a disk. In the 1990 title StarTropics, players were prompted to dip a physical copy of a letter included with the manual in water to reveal a code to progress the game.

=== Gameplay ===
Some video game manuals are integrated in gameplay as a game mechanic. In Tunic, players collect pieces of an in-game manual that reveals guidance on game mechanics.

== History ==
Manuals for early video games were intended as technical guides for the owners of coin-operated arcade video games. These manuals provided detail to assist the owner in the operation and maintenance of the machines, rather than for the player. Arcade manufacturers provided gameplay instruction by printing guidance on the cabinet.

Manuals designed for players became more prominent with game cartridges purchased for home consoles in the 1980s, as separately sold products with separate packaging. The lack of in-game instruction in early console games, due to limited memory, made manuals a desirable source of information. The Atari 2600 was one of the first popular cartridge-based systems to introduce the conventions of manual design, including a table of contents and section introducing a backstory to the game. In the late 1980s to 1990s, players supplemented information in a manual with hotlines and strategy guides, and later online methods such as playthrough videos, online forums and wikis.

=== Decline in use ===
The publication of video game manuals declined over time, and began during the late 2000s during the seventh generation of video game consoles. By the eighth generation, most releases discontinued publication of a manual. Ubisoft announced discontinuation of physical manuals in 2010, followed by Electronic Arts in 2011. Nintendo phased to the use of a digital manual for 3DS and Wii U systems by 2014, and discontinued manuals for most Nintendo Switch titles.

Manuals were discontinued by major publishers for several reasons. Fewer players read them or relied upon them to play the game, and the information provided in manuals was superseded by resources that could assist players with walkthroughs. The increasing sophistication of games allowed for player guidance to be embedded in-game in the form of a tutorial. Publishers accordingly reduced the expense and effort to produce manuals as part of their releases. The digital distribution of video games further limited physical publication of manuals, although digital copies were provided with some games.

== Bibliography ==
- deWinter, Jennifer (2014). "Just Playing Around: From Procedural Manuals to In-Game Training". In deWinter, Jennifer; Moeller, Ryan M. (eds.). Computer Games and Technical Communication: Critical Methods and Applications at the Intersection. Routledge.
- Hancock, Michael (2015). Games with Words: Textual Representation in the Wake of Graphical Realism in Videogames (Doctor of Philosophy thesis). University of Waterloo.
- Hancock, Michael (2019). "Playing It By The Book: Instructing and constructing the player in the videogame manual paratext". In Astrid Ensslin & Isabel Balteiro (ed.). Approaches to Videogame Discourse: Lexis, Interaction, Textuality. Bloomsbury Academic. pp. 288–304.
- Kocurek, Carly A. (2014). "Rendering Novelty Mundane: Technical Manuals in the Golden Age of Coin-Op Computer Games". In deWinter, Jennifer; Moeller, Ryan M. (eds.). Computer Games and Technical Communication: Critical Methods and Applications at the Intersection. Routledge.
