= Bound =

Bound or bounds may refer to:

== Mathematics ==
- Bound variable
- Upper and lower bounds, observed limits of mathematical functions

== Physics ==
- Bound state, a particle that has a tendency to remain localized in one or more regions of space

== Geography ==
- Bound Brook (Raritan River), a tributary of the Raritan River in New Jersey
- Bound Brook, New Jersey, a borough in Somerset County
- Boundary (real estate), the boundary of an estate is its bounds

== People ==
- Bound (surname)
- Bounds (surname)

== Arts, entertainment, and media ==
=== Films ===
- Bound (1996 film), an American neo-noir film by the Wachowskis
- Bound (2015 film), an American erotic thriller film by Jared Cohn
- Bound (2018 film), a Nigerian romantic drama film by Frank Rajah Arase
- Bound (2023 film), an American crime-drama/thriller film by Isaac Hirotsu Woofter

=== Television ===
- "Bound" (Fringe), an episode of Fringe
- "Bound" (The Secret Circle), an episode of The Secret Circle
- "Bound" (Star Trek: Enterprise), an episode of Star Trek: Enterprise

=== Other arts, entertainment, and media ===
- Bound (video game), a PlayStation 4 game
- "Bound", a song by Ponderosa Twins Plus One from their 1971 album 2 + 2 + 1 = Ponderosa Twins Plus One
- "Bound", a song by Darkane from their 1999 album Rusted Angel
- "Bound", a song by Suzanne Vega from her 2007 album Beauty & Crime
- Bount or Bound, a fictional race in the anime Bleach

== Other uses ==
- Bound (car), a British 4-wheeled cyclecar made in 1920
- Legally bound, see Contract
- Boundary (sports), the edges of a field
- Butts and bounds, delineation of property bounds
- Bound and free morphemes, in linguistics

== See also ==
- Bind (disambiguation)
- Bond (disambiguation)
- Bondage (disambiguation)
- Bound & Gagged (disambiguation)
- Boundary (disambiguation)
- Border (disambiguation)
- Demarcation (disambiguation)
