= Bounding =

Bounding may refer to:

- Establishing limits on the behavior of a process or device, see Listing and approval use and compliance
- Bounding overwatch, a variety of military maneuver
- A cyclical type of jumping motion

== See also ==
- Bound (disambiguation)
