= NBO =

NBO may refer to:

- National Bank of Oman
- National Bank Open
- National Brands Outlet
- Natural bond orbital, a model within quantum chemistry
- Network of Buddhist Organisations
- Network byte order
- Niobium monoxide (NbO)
- Non-binding opinion (disambiguation)
- Northolt Branch Observatories
- NBO, the IATA code for Jomo Kenyatta International Airport, Nairobi, Kenya
