= Rebinding (disambiguation) =

Rebinding is the renewal or replacement of the cover of a book.

Rebinding may also refer to:

- DNS rebinding, a method of manipulating resolution of domain names
- Rebinding, a change to the referencing identifier name binding in programming languages

== See also ==
- Bind (disambiguation)
