= Tier-Psychologie. Ist das Tier eine Maschine oder ein sensitives Wesen? =

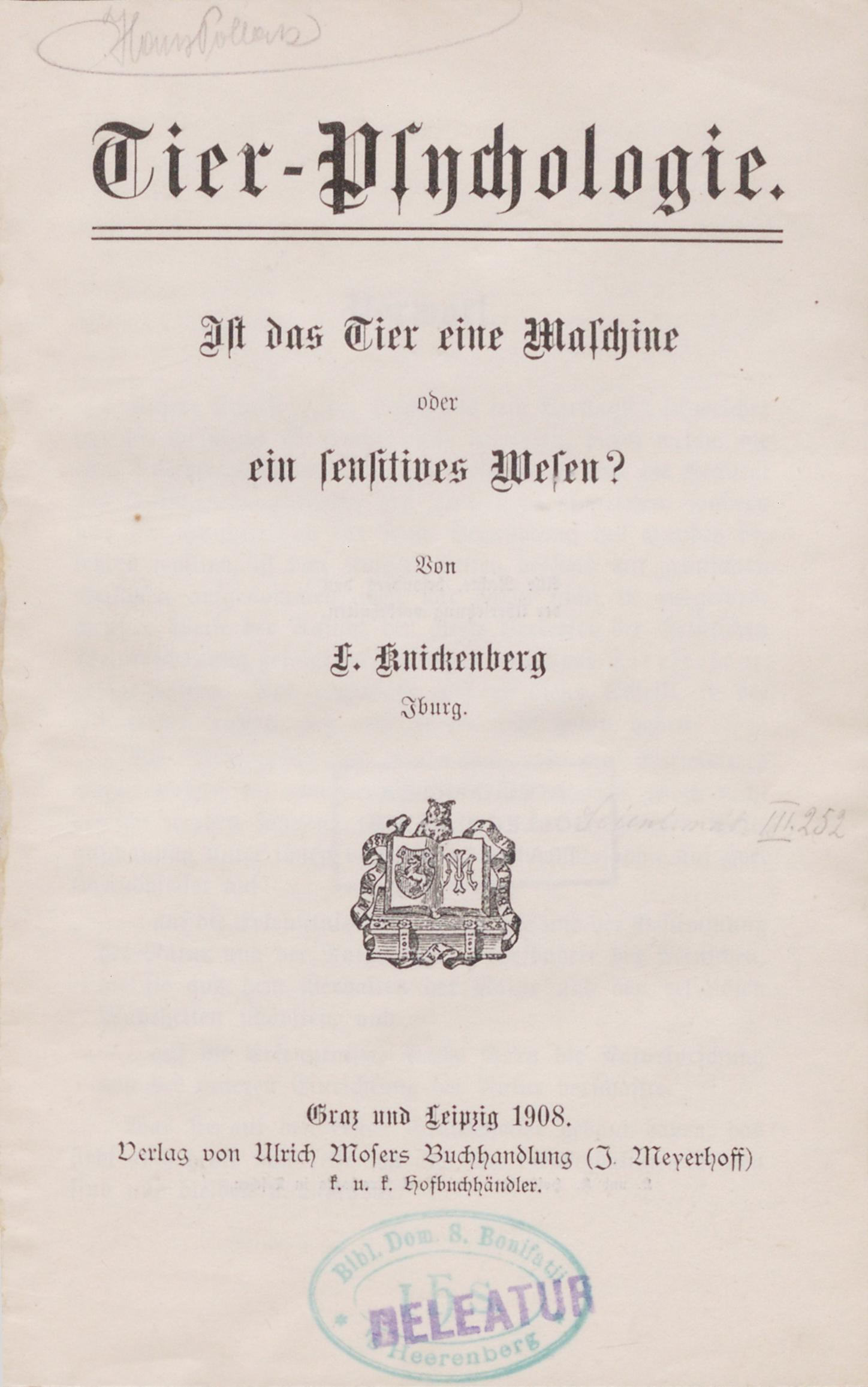
Title page of the book

Tier-Psychologie. Ist das Tier eine Maschine oder ein sensitives Wesen?... (in English: Animal-Psychology. Is the animal a machine or a sensitive being?...) is a book written by Fritz Knickenberg (6 February 1863 – 14 July 1932). It was first published in 1908, by the Ulrich Moser's bookstore (J. Meyerhoff) in Graz and Leipzig. The book was published for laypeople and was intended to serve as explanatory literature for a previous publishment, namely Der Hund und sein Verstand (in English: The dog and his mind).

In this book, Knickenberg aims at combining the Christian worldview with the mechanistic explanation of animal behavior by emphasizing on the uniqueness of the human soul and the perfection of the mechanistic nature created by God.

== Context ==
With the publication of his book, Knickenberg aims at providing background knowledge for his book 'Der Hund und sein "Verstand".', published in 1905, in which he addresses dog owners and their tendency to attribute human-like characteristics to their pets and that such analogies should not be made. Because the book did not contain many explanations to why such analogies should not be made, he decided to write a second book in order to introduce laypeople (i.e. dog owners) to the field of animal psychology. His intention for writing the present book was to defend the position of the absence of a soul in animals and to show that this does not cause damage to the Christian worldview, but that it complements it.

In the present book, he firmly emphasizes the distinction between the human mind and the animal mind and states that gained knowledge through introspection should not be applied to understand the animal mind. By taking position to the question in the title of his book, Knickenberg enters a scientific debate about the validity of comparative psychology. For the time of his publications, Knickenberg holds a conservative and not widely shared view on animal psychology. The view that animals cannot be compared to humans as they have no soul and function like machines is contrary to the anthropomorphic idea. Knickenberg aims at incorporating the research of his time to make it fit into a Christian worldview. He wants to make a clearer distinction between animals and humans by defining commonalities and differences between them.

With the release of Charles Darwin's book 'On the Origin of Species' in 1859, Darwin shared his anthropomorphic view of animals which enabled comparative psychologists to investigate human behavior on animals. Comparative psychology is the movement at the time of Knickenberg to which his publications are opposed to. Knickenberg makes use of Ivan Pavlov's research in classical conditioning from 1897, to emphasize the mechanistic nature of animals. With these findings, Pavlov also influences the field of behaviorism. Behaviorists diverge from Knickenbergs' view by applying the findings of classical conditioning to learn about human behavior. Knickenberg on the other hand, makes use of the stimulus–response model to reinforce the mechanistic view on animals, but not on humans as the human soul allows behavior outside the stimulus–response relationship. The mechanistic nature that is created by God to which Knickenberg is referring to in his book finds his inspiration in William Paley who set the conceptual origin for the term intelligent design.

== Contents ==
In the preface of his book, Knickenberg explains he wants to explain how recently gained knowledge by natural philosophers in the field of comparative psychology can be understood in the context of a Christian worldview without contradicting themselves. The recent findings Knickenberg refers to in the preface revolve around the approach to use animals in scientific research and comparing them to humans, also known as comparative psychology.

Throughout the book, he denies the option of comparing animals to humans by pointing out a number of differences that set animals and humans further apart. Because animal behavior can only be inferred from idiosyncratic human experiences, as the own mind is the only accessible source which does not necessarily need to overlap with the experiences animals have, the projection from the human mind to the animal mind cannot be justified. Knickenberg states the human and animal brain are functionally alike, but compared to humans, animals are not in possession of a soul. The soul, he states, is responsible for the initiation of self-directed movements and because only humans are in possession of a soul, people should not attribute personal experiences to their environment. This means that animals do not have a free will. Animals can be understood as machines that fit in a very complex mechanism, called nature. This idea is also known as intelligent design. In consequence, measurable commonalities such as vegetative functions between humans and animals can be used to understand more about the human soul, so the functions that are not part of it. In contrast, taking a look at differences between animals and humans deepens the understanding of the unique features of the soul. For example, the quality of fantasizing is exclusive to us humans, so it must lie in our soul. This can be explained because animals are unable to learn something new that is not rooted in their instinct.

The lack of a soul in animals also comes with the consequence of having no feelings. Knickenberg holds the view that animals mechanically react to pain the same way as humans do, without having the feeling of pain. This give people the moral right to eat animals. Animal welfare organizations do not exist because no harm should be done to animals, but to prevent human brutalization. Because the behavioral reactions of animals to pain look very similar to human reactions to that sensation, people would more easily be willing to also hurt other humans. The animal is just the result of its mechanic parts, chopping off parts of the animal reduces their functionality.

Striving is another quality that is exclusive to humans. Animals are unable to suppress their instincts which forces them to live in the moment and solely follow their instincts. Conclusively, striving must be a trait that is connected to the soul as it is another quality exclusive to humans.

The behavior that can be observed from animals is merely driven by their instincts. Whereas humans are able to suppress their drives through willpower that is given by their soul, animals' behavior can be explained solely by their instincts that are triggered by the environment. The noises, for example, that animals make are driven by their instincts. Animals with less pronounced instincts, will also make less noises. The mechanic reaction to the environment through instincts without own intentions goes back to the mechanistic view Knickenberg is portraying of animals.

Knickenberg also focuses on the topic of learning] Because both animals and humans are capable to learn, this quality must lie in the brain and not in the soul. However, animals are more restricted in the way they learn. Because they are not in possession of a soul, they cannot learn from fantasy, nor can they reflect on their experiences and make decisions based on that. Animals are only able to learn based on their instincts. They can only learn passively (i.e. animals need to be exposed to something repeatedly in their environment). For animals, the brain only reacts to specific objects in their environment, namely those that trigger their instincts. Dogs for example, are taught in a way that something (e.g. pain) that is connected to their instincts (i.e. that evokes a behavioral reaction) will be paired with something else (e.g. the noise of a whistle) in order to evoke the behavioral reaction of pain when only blowing the whistle after the training is complete. Giving dogs a name works the same way. Calling a dog by his name while playing and feeding him, connects the name to the social drive of the animal. This leads to the dog approaching the owner as soon as the dog is called by his name. Therefore, learning in animals is the result of shaping their instincts. In some animals, like dogs, instinct can be shaped in a way to tame them, whereas for other animals it is not possible to make them associate sensations from their environment to their instincts.

Knickenberg rounds up his book by summarizing the message of his writings. He imposes that a mechanistic view on animals is beneficial for Christianity and does not contradict it because it allows an even clearer distinction between humans and animals. He also refers back to the idea of intelligent design. Defining nature as being a complex mechanism increases the power of God, because no one else is able to create such a well designed and working machinery.

== Reception ==
Knickenbergs' publications were against the Zeitgeist concerning comparative psychology. Most scientists believed in the potential of comparative psychology and therefore, not many scientists shared Knickenberg's view at the time. Opinions of Knickenberg such as denying the existence of a soul in animals and suggesting a mechanistic nature were considered as extreme. Also, not many scientists saw the necessity of holding on to the Christian worldview. The view Knickenberg attempts to defend is not only considered as not conductive to reaching a goal at the time of his publications but also nowadays. The scientific success and validity of comparative psychology in the 21st century is well proven and founded. Nonetheless, this does not mean Knickenbergs' publications were not exerting any influence. The scientific method profits from a diverse research background. The concept of falsification drives comparative psychologists to strengthen their own scientific beliefs by falsifying Knickenbergs' idea of a mechanistic nature and therefore Knickenberg was indirectly involved in the advancement in the field of comparative psychology.

The book was used by Knickenberg to create an introduction of his views into animal psychology for laymen and intended to counteract the advancements in comparative psychology by uniting recent knowledge with the Christian idea about the distinction between animals and humans. This view, however, found very little support. The findings in comparative psychology in the years after his publication were overwhelming which led to the refutation of any other suggestions.

After the publication of the book, Knickenberg published the second and third edition of a book related to the history and nature of the region of Bad Iburg that was intended for tourists in that region and he published a book about the regulation of the succession on the Hanoverian farms according to the farm law, more specifically on marital property.
