= Stimulus–response model =

Conceptual framework in psychology

The stimulus–response model is a conceptual framework in psychology that describes how individuals react to external stimuli. According to this model, an external stimulus triggers a reaction in an organism, often without the need for conscious thought. This model emphasizes the mechanistic aspects of behavior, suggesting that behavior can often be predicted and controlled by understanding and manipulating the stimuli that trigger responses.

== Fields of application ==
Stimulus–response models are applied in international relations, psychology, risk assessment, neuroscience, neurally-inspired system design, and many other fields.

Pharmacological dose response relationships are an application of stimulus-response models.

Another field this model can be applied to is psychological problems/disorders such as Tourette syndrome. Research shows Gilles de la Tourette syndrome (GTS) can be characterized by enhanced cognitive functions related to creating, modifying and maintaining connections between stimuli and responses (S‐R links). Specifically, two areas, procedural sequence learning and, as a novel finding, also event file binding, show converging evidence of hyperfunctioning in GTS.

Previous research on E-learning has proven that studying online can be even more daunting for lecturers and students who suddenly change their learning patterns from the classrooms to the virtual ones. This is mainly because the suddenness of this change makes it difficult for lecturers to fully prepare to lecture in the virtual learning environment. In light of the above-mentioned facts, this research proposes a novel model and integrates flow theory into the theory of technology acceptance model (TAM), based on stimulus-organism-response (S-O-R) theory, the SOR model has been widely used in previous studies of online customer behavior, and the model theory includes three components: stimulus, organism, and response. Assuming that stimuli contained in the external environment cause people to change, which affects their behavior.

== Mathematical formulation ==
The object of a stimulus–response model is to establish a mathematical function that describes the relation f between the stimulus x and the expected value (or other measure of location) of the response Y:

$$\mathrm{E}(Y) = f(x)$$

A common simplification assumed for such functions is linear, thus we expect to see a relationship like

$$\mathrm{E}(Y) = \alpha + \beta x.$$

Statistical theory for linear models has been well developed for more than fifty years, and a standard form of analysis called linear regression has been developed.

== Bounded response functions ==
Since many types of response have inherent physical limitations (e.g. minimal maximal muscle contraction), it is often applicable to use a bounded function (such as the logistic function) to model the response. Similarly, a linear response function may be unrealistic as it would imply arbitrarily large responses. For binary dependent variables, statistical analysis with regression methods such as the probit model or logit model, or other methods such as the Spearman–Kärber method. Empirical models based on nonlinear regression are usually preferred over the use of some transformation of the data that linearizes the stimulus-response relationship.

One example of a logit model for the probability of a response to the real input (stimulus) $x$, ($x\in \mathbb R$) is

$$p(x) = \frac {1}{1+e^{-(\beta_0 + \beta_1 x)}}$$

where $\beta_0, \beta_1$ are the parameters of the function.

Conversely, a Probit model would be of the form

$$p(x) = \Phi(\beta_0 + \beta_1 x)$$

where $\Phi(x)$ is the cumulative distribution function of the normal distribution.

=== Hill equation ===
In biochemistry and pharmacology, the Hill equation refers to two closely related equations, one of which describes the response (the physiological output of the system, such as muscle contraction) to Drug or Toxin, as a function of the drug's concentration. The Hill equation is important in the construction of dose-response curves. The Hill equation is the following formula, where $E$ is the magnitude of the response, $\ce{[A]}$ is the drug concentration (or equivalently, stimulus intensity), $\mathrm{EC}_{50}$ is the drug concentration that produces a half-maximal response and $n$ is the Hill coefficient.

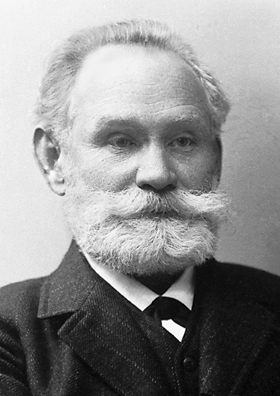
Ivan Pavlov

$\frac{E}{E_{\mathrm{max}}}=\frac{1}{1+\left(\frac{\mathrm{EC}_{50}}{[A]}\right)^{n}}$

The Hill equation rearranges to a logistic function with respect to the logarithm of the dose (similar to a logit model).

== Founder of the Model ==
=== Ivan Pavlov ===
Pavlov started studying the digestive system in dogs by performing chronic implants of fistulas in the stomach, by which he was able to show with extreme clarity that the nervous system plays a dominant role in the regulation of the digestive process. Experiments on digestion led to the development of the first experimental model of learning, in which a neutral stimulus acquires the capacity to evoke a specific response further to repeated pairing with another stimulus that evokes the response.

==== Edward Thorndike ====
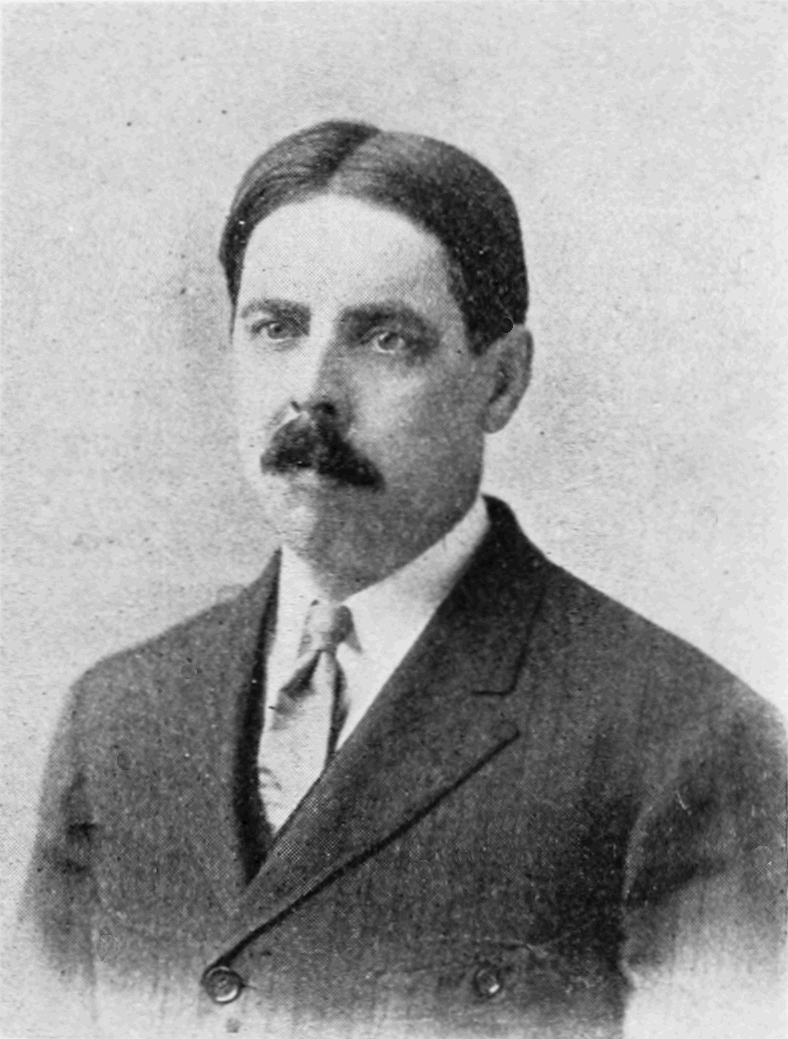
Edward Thorndike

Thorndike, who proposed the model, believed that learning stemmed from stimulus and response. Pavlov popularized and revolutionized the theory though by experimenting on the dogs.
