= Reversible Hill equation =

Mathematical concept

The classic Monod–Wyman–Changeux model (MWC) for cooperativity is generally published in an irreversible form. That is, there are no product terms in the rate equation which can be problematic for those wishing to build metabolic models since there are no product inhibition terms. However, a series of publications by Popova and Sel'kov derived the MWC rate equation for the reversible, multi-substrate, multi-product reaction.

The same problem applies to the classic Hill equation which is almost always shown in an irreversible form. Hofmeyr and Cornish-Bowden first published the reversible form of the Hill equation. The equation has since been discussed elsewhere and the model has also been used in a number of kinetic models such as a model of Phosphofructokinase and Glycolytic Oscillations in the Pancreatic β-cells or a model of a glucose-xylose co-utilizing S. cerevisiae strain. The model has also been discussed in modern enzyme kinetics textbooks.

== Derivation ==
Consider the simpler case where there are two binding sites. See the scheme shown below. Each site is assumed to bind either molecule of substrate S or product P. The catalytic reaction is shown by the two reactions at the base of the scheme triangle, that is S to P and P to S. The model assumes the binding steps are always at equilibrium. The reaction rate is given by:

$v=k_1\left(E S+2 E S_2+E S P\right)-k_2\left(E P+2 E P_2+E S P\right)$

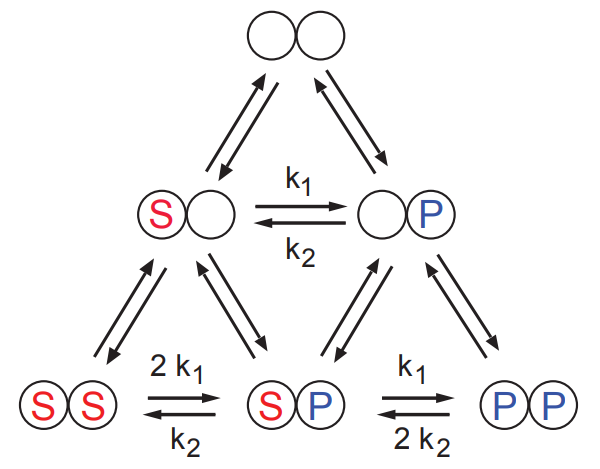

Invoking the rapid-equilibrium assumption we can write the various complexes in terms of equilibrium constants to give:

$v =\frac{V_f \sigma(1-\rho)(\sigma+\pi)}{1+(\sigma+\pi)^2}$

where $\rho=\Gamma / K_{eq}$. The $\sigma$ and $\pi$ terms are the ratio of substrate and product to their respective half-saturation constants, namely $\sigma = S/S_{0.5}$ and $\pi = P/P_{0.5}$ and

Using the author's own notation, if an enzyme has $h$ sites that can bind ligand, the form, in the general case, can be shown to be:

$v = \frac{V_f \sigma(1-\rho)(\sigma+\pi)^{h-1}}{1+(\sigma+\pi)^h}$

The non-cooperative reversible Michaelis-Menten equation can be seen to emerge when we set the Hill coefficient to one.

If the enzyme is irreversible the equation turns into the simple Michaelis-Menten equation that is irreversible. When setting the equilibrium constant to infinity, the equation can be seen to revert to the simpler case where the product inhibits the reverse step.

A comparison has been made between the MWC and reversible Hill equation.

A modification of the reversible Hill equation was published by Westermark et al where modifiers affected the catalytic properties instead. This variant was shown to provide a much better fit for describing the kinetics of muscle phosphofructokinase.
