= Hill equation (biochemistry) =

Diagram showing the proportion of a receptor bound to a ligand

Binding curves showing the characteristically sigmoidal curves generated by using the Hill equation to model cooperative binding. Each curve corresponds to a different Hill coefficient, labeled to the curve's right. The vertical axis displays the proportion of the total number of receptors that have been bound by a ligand. The horizontal axis is the concentration of the ligand. As the Hill coefficient is increased, the saturation curve becomes steeper.

In biochemistry and pharmacology, the Hill equation refers to two closely related equations that reflect the binding of ligands to macromolecules, as a function of the ligand concentration. A ligand is "a substance that forms a complex with a biomolecule to serve a biological purpose," and a macromolecule is a very large molecule, such as a protein, with a complex structure of components. Protein-ligand binding typically changes the structure of the target protein, thereby changing its function in a cell.

The distinction between the two Hill equations is whether they measure occupancy or response. The Hill equation reflects the occupancy of macromolecules: the fraction that is saturated or bound by the ligand. (Note: For clarity, this article will use the International Union of Basic and Clinical Pharmacology convention of distinguishing between the Hill-Langmuir equation (for receptor saturation) and Hill equation (for tissue response)) This equation is formally equivalent to the Langmuir isotherm. Conversely, the Hill equation proper reflects the cellular or tissue response to the ligand: the physiological output of the system, such as muscle contraction.

The Hill equation was originally formulated by Archibald Hill in 1910 to describe the sigmoidal O_{2} binding curve of hemoglobin.

The binding of a ligand to a macromolecule is often enhanced if there are already other ligands present on the same macromolecule (this is known as cooperative binding). The Hill equation is useful for determining the degree of cooperativity of the ligand(s) binding to the enzyme or receptor. The Hill coefficient provides a way to quantify the degree of interaction between ligand binding sites.

The Hill equation (for response) is important in the construction of dose-response curves.

== Proportion of ligand-bound receptors ==
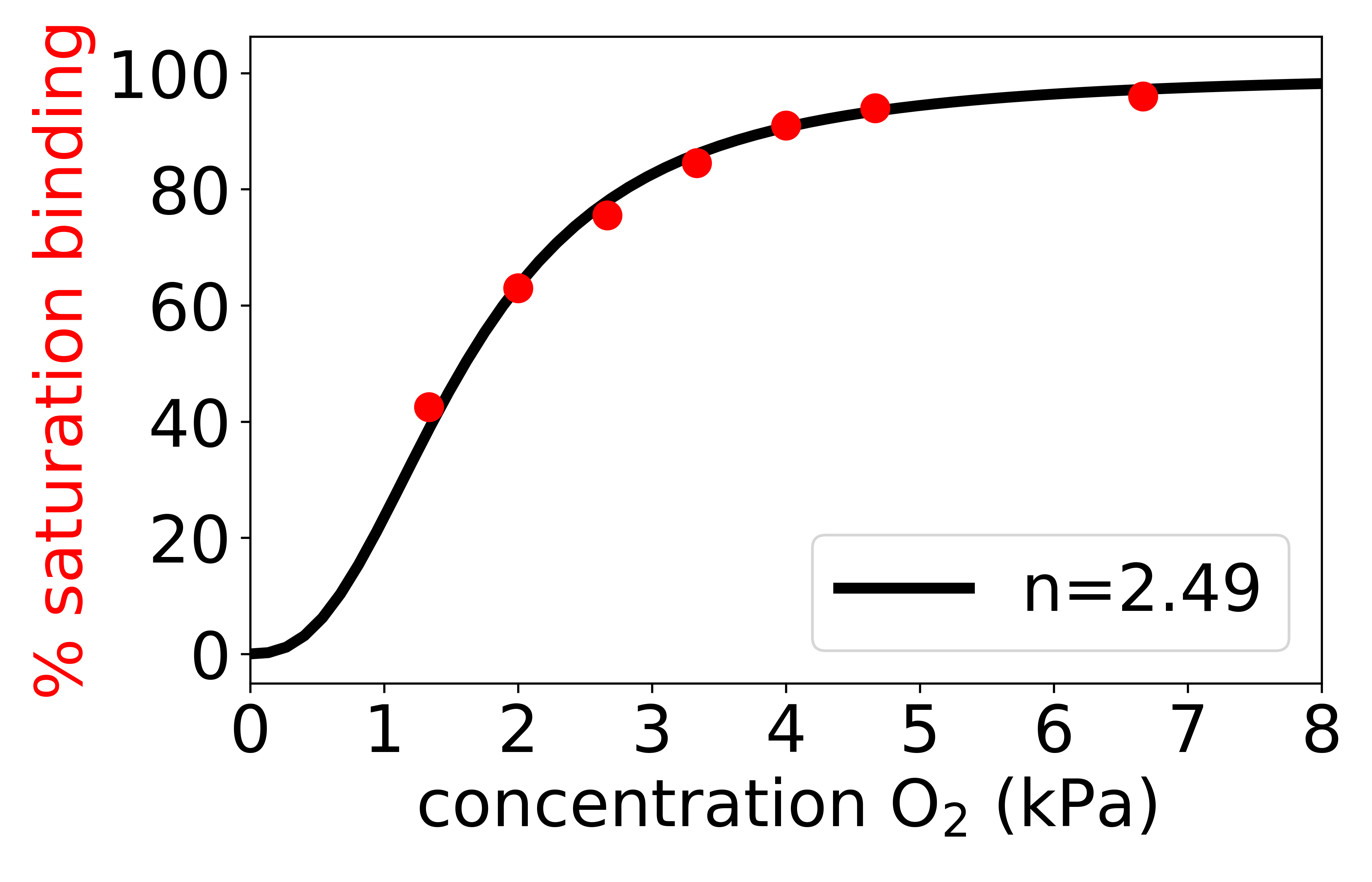
Plot of the % saturation of oxygen binding to haemoglobin, as a function of the amount of oxygen present (expressed as an oxygen pressure). Data (red circles) and Hill equation fit (black curve) from original 1910 paper of Hill.

The Hill equation is commonly expressed in the following ways:

$$\begin{align}\theta &= {[\ce L]^n \over K_d + [\ce L]^n}\\
&= {[\ce L]^n \over (K_A)^n + [\ce L]^n}\\
&= {1 \over 1+\left({K_A \over [\ce L]}\right)^n}\end{align}$$,

where

- $\theta$ is the fraction of the receptor protein concentration that is bound by the ligand,
- $\ce{[L]}$is the total ligand concentration,
- $K_d$ is the apparent dissociation constant derived from the law of mass action,
- $K_A$ is the ligand concentration producing half occupation,
- $n$ is the Hill coefficient.

The special case where $n=1$ is a Monod equation.

=== Constants ===
In pharmacology, $\theta$ is often written as $p_\ce{AR}$, where $\ce{A}$ is the ligand, equivalent to L, and $\ce{R}$ is the receptor. $\theta$ can be expressed in terms of the total amount of receptor and ligand-bound receptor concentrations: $\theta = \frac\ce{[LR]}\ce{[R_{\rm total}]}$. $K_d$ is equal to the ratio of the dissociation rate of the ligand-receptor complex to its association rate ($K_{\rm d} = {k_{\rm d} \over k_{\rm a}}$). Kd is the equilibrium constant for dissociation. $K_A$ is defined so that $(K_A)^n = K_{\rm d} = {k_{\rm d} \over k_{\rm a}}$, this is also known as the microscopic dissociation constant and is the ligand concentration occupying half of the binding sites. In recent literature, this constant is sometimes referred to as $K_D$.

=== Gaddum equation ===
The Gaddum equation is a further generalisation of the Hill-equation, incorporating the presence of a reversible competitive antagonist. The Gaddum equation is derived similarly to the Hill-equation but with 2 equilibria: both the ligand with the receptor and the antagonist with the receptor. Hence, the Gaddum equation has 2 constants: the equilibrium constants of the ligand and that of the antagonist

=== Hill plot ===
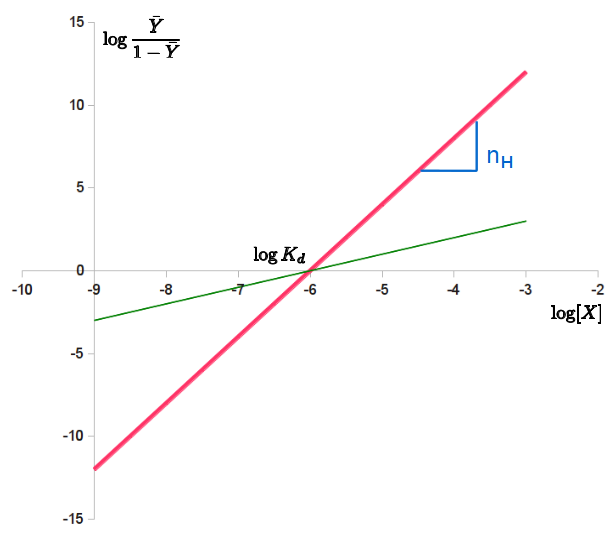
A Hill plot, where the x-axis is the logarithm of the ligand concentration and the y-axis is the transformed receptor occupancy. X represents L and Y represents theta.

The Hill plot is the rearrangement of the Hill equation into a straight line.

Taking the reciprocal of both sides of the Hill equation, rearranging, and inverting again yields: ${\theta\over 1-\theta} = {[\ce L]^n \over K_d } = {[\ce L]^n \over (K_A)^n }$. Taking the logarithm of both sides of the equation leads to an alternative formulation of the Hill-Langmuir equation:

$$\begin{align}\log\left( {\theta\over 1-\theta} \right)
&= n \log{[\ce L]} - \log{K_d}\\
&= n \log{[\ce L]} - n \log{K_A}
\end{align}$$.

This last form of the Hill equation is advantageous because a plot of $\log\left( {\theta\over 1-\theta} \right)$ versus $\log{[\ce L]}$ yields a linear plot, which is called a Hill plot. Because the slope of a Hill plot is equal to the Hill coefficient for the biochemical interaction, the slope is denoted by $n_H$. A slope greater than one thus indicates positively cooperative binding between the receptor and the ligand, while a slope less than one indicates negatively cooperative binding.

Transformations of equations into linear forms such as this were very useful before the widespread use of computers, as they allowed researchers to determine parameters by fitting lines to data. However, these transformations affect error propagation, and this may result in undue weight to error in data points near 0 or 1. (Note: See Propagation of uncertainty. The function $f(\theta)=\log_{10}\left(\frac{\theta}{1-\theta}\right)$ propagates errors in $\theta$ as $\delta_f=\delta_\theta\frac{\mathrm{d}f}{\mathrm{d}\theta}=\frac{\delta_\theta}{(\ln10)\,\theta(1-\theta)}$. Hence errors in values of $\theta$ near $0$ or $1$ are given far more weight than those for $\theta\approx0.5$) This impacts the parameters of linear regression lines fitted to the data. Furthermore, the use of computers enables more robust analysis involving nonlinear regression.

== Tissue response ==
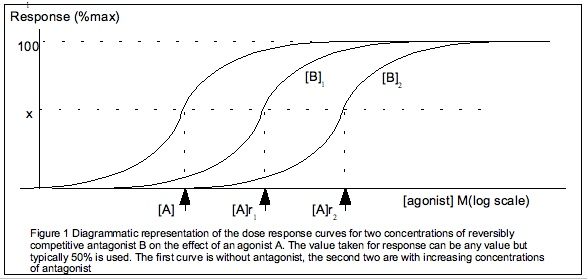
A trio of dose response curves

A distinction should be made between quantification of drugs binding to receptors and drugs producing responses. There may not necessarily be a linear relationship between the two values. The IUPHAR defines the Hill equation in terms of the tissue response $(E)$, as
$$\begin{align}
\frac{E}{E_{\mathrm{max}}}&=\frac{[A]^n}{\text{EC}_{50}^n+[A]^n}\\
&=\frac{1}{1+\left(\frac{\text{EC}_{50}}{[A]}\right)^{n}}
\end{align}$$
where $\ce{[A]}$ is the drug concentration, $n$ is the Hill coefficient, and $\text{EC}_{50}$ is the drug concentration that produces a 50% maximal response. Dissociation constants (in the previous section) relate to ligand binding, while $\text{EC}_{50}$ reflects tissue response.

This form of the equation can reflect tissue/cell/population responses to drugs and can be used to generate dose response curves. The relationship between $K_d$ and EC50 may be quite complex as a biological response will be the sum of myriad factors; a drug will have a different biological effect if more receptors are present, regardless of its affinity.

The Del-Castillo Katz model is used to relate the Hill equation to receptor activation by including a second equilibrium of the ligand-bound receptor to an activated form of the ligand-bound receptor.

Statistical analysis of response as a function of stimulus may be performed by regression methods such as the probit model or logit model, or other methods such as the Spearman–Kärber method. Empirical models based on nonlinear regression are usually preferred over the use of some transformation of the data that linearizes the dose-response relationship.

== Hill coefficient ==
The Hill coefficient is a measure of ultrasensitivity (i.e. how steep is the response curve).

The Hill coefficient, $n$ or $n_H$, may describe cooperativity (or possibly other biochemical properties, depending on the context in which the Hill equation is being used). When appropriate, the value of the Hill coefficient describes the cooperativity of ligand binding in the following way:

- $n>1$. Positively cooperative binding: Once one ligand molecule is bound to the enzyme, its affinity for other ligand molecules increases. For example, the Hill coefficient of oxygen binding to haemoglobin (an example of positive cooperativity) falls within the range of 1.7–3.2.
- $n<1$. Negatively cooperative binding: Once one ligand molecule is bound to the enzyme, its affinity for other ligand molecules decreases.
- $n=1$. Noncooperative (completely independent) binding: The affinity of the enzyme for a ligand molecule is not dependent on whether or not other ligand molecules are already bound. When n=1, we obtain a model that can be modeled by Michaelis–Menten kinetics, in which $K_D = K_A = K_M$, the Michaelis–Menten constant.

The Hill coefficient can be calculated approximately in terms of the cooperativity index of Taketa and Pogell as follows:

$$n = \frac{ \log_{10}(81)}{\log_{10}(\ce{EC90}/\ce{EC10})}$$.

where $\ce{EC90}$ and $\ce{EC10}$ are the input values needed to produce the 10% and 90% of the maximal response, respectively.

== Reversible form ==
The most common form of the Hill equation is its irreversible form. However, when building computational models a reversible form is often required in order to model product inhibition. For this reason, Hofmeyr and Cornish-Bowden devised the reversible Hill equation.

== Relationship to the elasticity coefficients ==
The Hill coefficient is also intimately connected to the elasticity coefficient where the Hill coefficient can be shown to equal:

$n = \varepsilon^v_s \frac{1}{1 - \theta}$

where $\theta$ is the fractional saturation, $ES/E_t$, and $\varepsilon^v_s$ the elasticity coefficient.

This is derived by taking the slope of the Hill equation:

$n = \frac{d\log \frac{\theta}{1-\theta}}{d\log s}$

and expanding the slope using the quotient rule. The result shows that the elasticity can never exceed $n$ since the equation above can be rearranged to:

$\varepsilon^v_s = n (1 - \theta)$

== Applications ==
The Hill equation is used extensively in pharmacology to quantify the functional parameters of a drug and are also used in other areas of biochemistry.

The Hill equation can be used to describe dose-response relationships, for example ion channel open-probability (P-open) vs. ligand concentration.

=== Regulation of gene transcription ===
The Hill equation can be applied in modelling the rate at which a gene product is produced when its parent gene is being regulated by transcription factors (e.g., activators and/or repressors). Doing so is appropriate when a gene is regulated by multiple binding sites for transcription factors, in which case the transcription factors may bind the DNA in a cooperative fashion.

If the production of protein from gene X is up-regulated (activated) by a transcription factor Y, then the rate of production of protein X can be modeled as a differential equation in terms of the concentration of activated Y protein:

$${\mathrm{d} \over \mathrm{d}t} [{\rm X_{produced}}]= k\ \cdot { {[{\rm Y_{active}}]^\mathit{n} } \over {(K_A)^n\ +\ {[{\rm Y_{active}}]^\mathit{n}} } }$$,

where k is the maximal transcription rate of gene X.

Likewise, if the production of protein from gene Y is down-regulated (repressed) by a transcription factor Z, then the rate of production of protein Y can be modeled as a differential equation in terms of the concentration of activated Z protein:

$${\mathrm{d} \over \mathrm{d}t} [{\rm Y_{produced}}]= k\ \cdot { {(K_A)^\mathit{n} } \over {(K_A)^n\ +\ {[{\rm Z_{active}}]^\mathit{n}} } }$$,

where k is the maximal transcription rate of gene Y.

== Limitations ==
Because of its assumption that ligand molecules bind to a receptor simultaneously, the Hill equation has been criticized as a physically unrealistic model. Moreover, the Hill coefficient should not be considered a reliable approximation of the number of cooperative ligand binding sites on a receptor except when the binding of the first and subsequent ligands results in extreme positive cooperativity.

Unlike more complex models, the relatively simple Hill equation provides little insight into underlying physiological mechanisms of protein-ligand interactions. This simplicity, however, is what makes the Hill equation a useful empirical model, since its use requires little a priori knowledge about the properties of either the protein or ligand being studied. Nevertheless, other, more complex models of cooperative binding have been proposed. For more information and examples of such models, see Cooperative binding.

Global sensitivity measure such as Hill coefficient do not characterise the local behaviours of the s-shaped curves. Instead, these features are well captured by the response coefficient measure.

There is a link between Hill Coefficient and Response coefficient, as follows. Altszyler et al. (2017) have shown that these ultrasensitivity measures can be linked.

== See also ==
- Binding coefficient
- Bjerrum plot
- Cooperative binding
- Gompertz curve
- Langmuir adsorption model
- Logistic function
- Michaelis–Menten kinetics
- Monod equation
