= EC50 =

Concentration of a compound where 50% of its maximal effect is observed

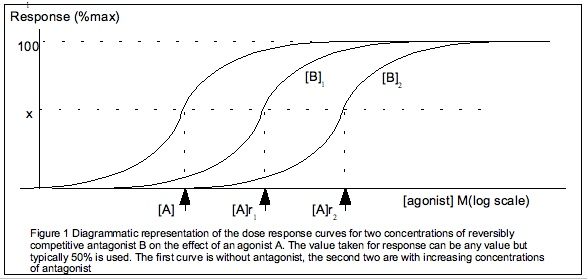
The tissue response (y-axis) to an agonist, in log concentration (x-axis), in the presence of different antagonist concentrations. The EC_{50} of the agonist is represented by the x co-ordinate that corresponds with the half-maximum of the leftmost curve. This is denoted by [A]

Half maximal effective concentration (EC_{50}) is a measure of the concentration of a drug, antibody or toxicant which induces a biological response halfway between the baseline and maximum after a specified exposure time. More simply, EC_{50} can be defined as the concentration required to obtain a 50% [...] effect and may be also written as [A]_{50}. It is commonly used as a measure of a drug's potency, although the use of EC_{50} is preferred over that of 'potency', which has been criticised for its vagueness. EC_{50} is a measure of concentration, expressed in molar units (M), where 1 M is equivalent to 1 mol/L.

The EC_{50} of a graded dose response curve therefore represents the concentration of a compound where 50% of its maximal effect is observed. The EC_{50} of a quantal dose response curve represents the concentration of a compound where 50% of the population exhibit a response, after a specified exposure duration.

For clarification, a graded dose response curve shows the graded effect of the drug (y axis) over the dose of the drug (x axis) in one or an average of subjects. A quantal dose response curve shows the percentage of subjects where a response is noted in an all-or-none manner (y axis) over the dose of the drug (x axis).

For competition binding assays and functional antagonist assays IC_{50} is the most common summary measure of the dose-response curve. For agonist/stimulator assays the most common summary measure is the EC_{50}.

The EC_{50} is also related to IC_{50} which is a measure of a compound's inhibition (50% inhibition).

== Calculation of EC_{50} ==
Biological responses to ligand concentrations typically follow a sigmoidal function. The inflection point at which the increase in response with increasing ligand concentration begins to slow is the EC_{50}, which can be mathematically determined by derivation of the best-fit line. While relying on a graph for estimation is more convenient, this typical method yields less accurate and precise results.

The response or effect, E, is dependent on both the binding of the drug and the drug-bound receptor. The agonist that binds to the receptor and initiates the response is usually abbreviated A or D. At low agonist concentrations, [A], the response, E is immeasurably low but at higher [A], E becomes measurable. E increases with [A] until at sufficiently high [A], when E plateaus towards an asymptotic maximum attainable response, E_{max}. The [A] at which E is 50% of E_{max} is termed the half maximal effective concentration and is abbreviated EC_{50}, or rarely [A]_{50}. The term "potency" refers to the EC_{50} value. The lower the EC_{50}, the less the concentration of a drug is required to produce 50% of maximum effect and the higher the potency. The EC_{10} and EC_{90} concentrations to induce 10% and 90% maximal responses are defined similarly.

There is a wide range of EC_{50} values of drugs; they are typically anywhere from nM to mM. Hence, it is often more practical to refer to the logarithmically transformed pEC_{50} values instead of EC_{50}, where

$\ce{pEC50} = -\log_{10} (\ce{EC50})$.

== Relation to affinity and efficacy ==
A drug's potency is dependent on the drug's affinity and efficacy.

=== Affinity ===
Affinity describes how well a drug can bind to a receptor. Faster or stronger binding is represented by a higher affinity, or equivalently a lower dissociation constant. The EC_{50} should not be confused with the affinity constant, K_{d}. While the former reflects the drug concentration needed for a level of tissue response, the latter reflects the drug concentration needed for an amount of receptor binding.

=== Efficacy ===
Efficacy is the relationship between receptor occupancy and the ability to initiate a response at the molecular, cellular, tissue or system level.

== Relation to the Hill Equation ==
The EC_{50} relates to the Hill equation, which is a function of the agonist concentration, [A]:

$E = \frac{{[A]}^n \times {E_{\mathrm{max}}}}{{{[A]}^n + \mathrm{EC}_{50}^{n}}}$

where E is the observed response or effect above baseline, and n, the Hill coefficient reflects the slope of the curve.

The EC_{50} represents the point of inflection of the Hill equation, beyond which increases of [A] have less impact on E. In dose response curves, the logarithm of [A] is often taken, turning the Hill equation into a sigmoidal logistic function. In this case, the EC_{50} represents the rising section of the sigmoid curve.

== Limitations ==
The effects of a stressor or drug generally depend on the exposure time. Therefore, the EC_{50} (and similar statistics) will be a function of exposure time. The exact shape of this time function will depend upon the stressor (e.g., the specific toxicant), its mechanism of action, the organism exposed, etc. This time dependency hampers the comparison of potency or toxicity between compounds and between different organisms.

A drug will not have a single value of EC_{50} due to different tissues having different sensitivities to the drug (in part due to tissue specific receptor expression). Furthermore, EC_{50} is dependent on many factors including species, tissue and cell type and genetics.

== See also ==
- Measures of pollutant concentration
- Certain safety factor
- LD_{50} (median lethal dose)
- Therapeutic index
