= Binder =

Binder may refer to:

== Businesses ==
- Binder FBM, a former German jewelry manufactory
- Binder Dijker Otte & Co., the expansion of "BDO" in BDO International

== Computing ==
- Binder Project, package and share interactive, reproducible environments
- File binder, software that binds files into one executable
- Microsoft Binder, a discontinued Microsoft Office application
- OpenBinder, a system for inter-process communication
- Binder, an alternative to the Linkage Editor in MVS, introduced in Data Facility Storage Management Subsystem.

== Geography ==
- Binder, Khentii, a district of Khentii Province in eastern Mongolia
- Binder, an abandoned village in Germany at the site of Hunnesrück

== Stationery ==
- Binder (rubber band)
- Binder clip, a small device for holding together sheets of paper
- Ring binder, a device to hold together multiple sheets of paper with punched-in holes

== Other uses ==
- Binder (material), any material or substance that holds or draws other materials together
- Binder (surname), a surname
- Binder Twine Festival, an annual festival in Kleinburg, Ontario
- Phosphate binder, a medication used to reduce the absorption of phosphate
- Reaper-binder, a type of farm equipment
- A garment or bandage used for breast binding
- A base class in the role-playing game Dungeons & Dragons
- Insurance Binder, a contract of a temporary insurance policy
- The film-forming component of paint

== See also ==
- Binding (disambiguation)
- Bind (disambiguation)
