= Non-binding =

Non-binding or nonbinding may refer to

- Nonbinding allocation of responsibility (NBAR) in a superfund
- Non-binding authority in law
- Non-binding arbitration
- Non-binding constraint, mathematics
- Non-binding opinion in patent law:
  - International preliminary report on patentability objective
  - Non-binding opinion (United Kingdom patent law)
- Non-binding resolution
- Non-binding referendum

== See also ==
- Binding (disambiguation)
