= Mönsheim =

German municipality

- Municipality
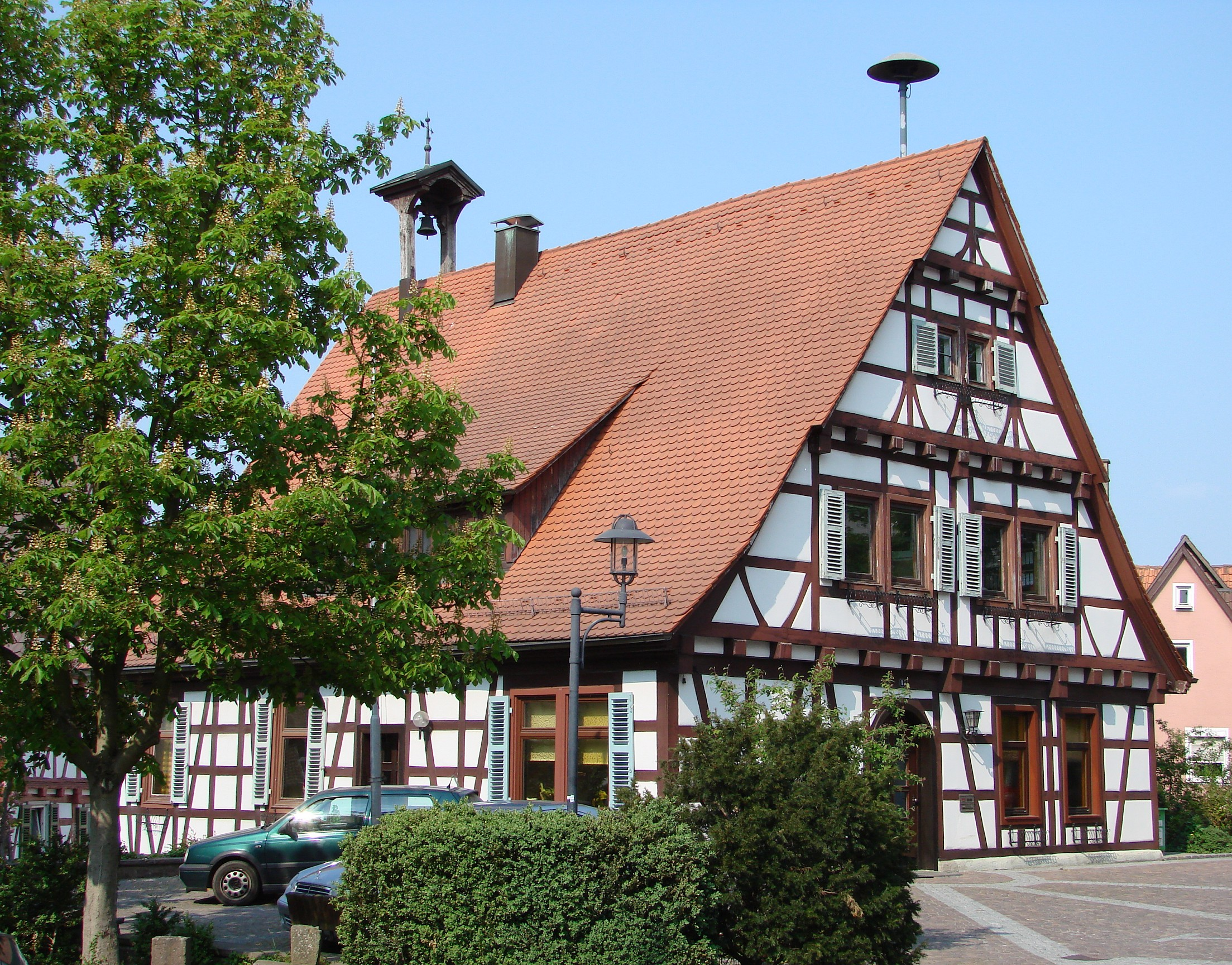
- Town hall

- Coat of arms

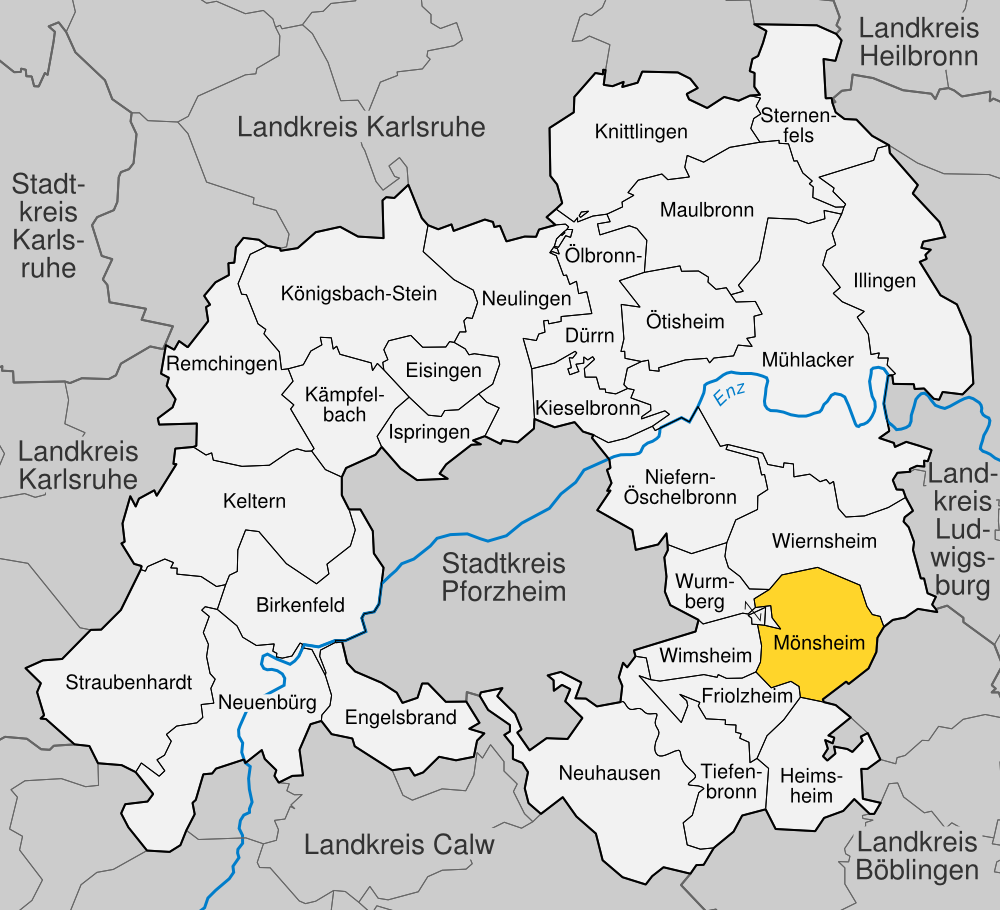
- Location of Mönsheim within Enzkreis district
- Interactive map of Mönsheim
- Location within Germany Location within Baden-Württemberg
- Coordinates: 48°51′52″N 8°51′53″E
- Country: Germany
- State: Baden-Württemberg
- Admin. region: Karlsruhe
- District: Enzkreis

Government
  - Mayor (2022–30): Michael Maurer

Area
  - Total: 16.78 km^{2} (6.48 sq mi)
- Elevation: 432 m (1,417 ft)

Population (2025-12-31)
  - Total: 2,875
  - Density: 171.3/km^{2} (443.8/sq mi)
- Time zone: UTC+01:00 (CET)
  - Summer (DST): UTC+02:00 (CEST)
- Postal codes: 71297
- Dialling codes: 07044
- Vehicle registration: PF
- Website: www.moensheim.de

Mönsheim is a municipality in the Enz district of Baden-Württemberg, Germany.

== History ==
Mönsheim became a possession of the Duchy of Württemberg in the 16th century. The town was assigned to the district of Leonberg, then its Oberamt on 18 March 1806, and finally to Landkreis Leonberg on 1 October 1938. When the Enz district was created by the 1973 Baden-Württemberg district reform, Mönsheim was reassigned to it.

About 70 kilometers (43 mi) of the lower Grenzbach in Mönsheim was placed under Federal protection as a Naturschutzgebiet in 1967.

Binder FBM, a jewellery manufacturer, has been based in Mönsheim since 1910.

== Geography ==
The municipality (Gemeinde) of Mönsheim covers 16.78 square kilometers (6.48 mi^{2}) of the Enz district, within the state of Baden-Württemberg, in the Federal Republic of Germany. Mönsheim is physically located on the Heckengäu, at the southwestern edge of the Neckar basin. The Heckengäu's table-like, karstified and forested muschelkalk hills describe much of Mönsheim's geography. The Grenzbach, a tributary of the Enz, is the main watercourse and marks its lowest elevation above sea level, 314 meters (1,030 ft) Normalnull (NN) at the border with Wiernsheim. The highest elevation, 509 meters (1,670 ft) NN, is found at the top of the Geißelberg.

== Demographics ==
Population development:

Year	Inhabitants
1990	2.457
2001	2,699
2011	2,640
2021	2,965

== Coat of arms ==
Mönsheim's municipal coat of arms shows a white, crenelated tower with a pointed roof on a green three-crested hill upon a field of red. This pattern was created in 1930 on the advice of the Central State Archive Stuttgart and was informed by the earliest town coat of arms, dated to 1598. The fortified tower, a motif that has represented Mönsheim since the 19th century, is a reference to a nearby keep given to the town in the 15th century by Duke Eberhard I.
