= Bind =

Bind or BIND may refer to:

== Science and technology ==
- BIND (Berkeley Internet Name Daemon), Domain Name System software
- Bind (higher-order function), an operation in a monad
- Bind, a client to a server in client–server computing
- Neodymium bismuthide, a chemical with the formula BiNd or NdBi.

== Other uses ==
- Bookbinding, the process of physically assembling a book from a number of folded or unfolded sheets of paper or other material
- Foot binding, the custom of applying tight binding to the feet of young girls to prevent further growth
- Bind (caste), Indian caste name
- Bind rune, a ligature of two or more runes
- Bind (chess), a strong grip or stranglehold on a position that is difficult for the opponent to break

== See also ==
- Bondage (disambiguation)
- Binding (disambiguation)
- Binder (disambiguation)
