= Bondsman =

Bondsman may refer to:

- bail bondsman
- indentured servant, may be called a "bondservant"

Bondsman may also refer to:

- The Bondsman, an American television series.
