= Binding constant =

Chemical property

The binding constant, or affinity constant/association constant, is a special case of the equilibrium constant K, and is the inverse of the dissociation constant. It is associated with the binding and unbinding reaction of molecules. Consider a binding reaction between two molecules, X and Y, which is formalized as:

X + Y ⇌ XY

The reaction is characterized by the on-rate constant k_{on} and the off-rate constant k_{off}, which have units of M^{−1} s^{−1} and s^{−1}, respectively. In equilibrium, the forward binding transition X + Y → XY should be balanced by the backward unbinding transition XY → X + Y. That is,

$$k_{\rm on}\,[{\rm X}]\,[{\rm Y}] = k_{\rm off}\,[{\rm XY}]$$

where [X] and [Y] represent the concentration of unbound molecules, while [XY] represents the concentration of bound complexes. The binding constant K_{a} is defined by

$K_{\rm a} = {k_{\rm on} \over k_{\rm off}} = {[{\rm XY}] \over {[{\rm X}]\,[{\rm Y}]}}$.

An often considered quantity is the dissociation constant K_{d} ≡ 1/K_{a}, which has the unit of concentration, despite the fact that strictly speaking, all association constants are unitless values. The inclusion of units arises from the simplification that such constants are calculated solely from concentrations, which is not the case. Once chemical activity is factored into the correct form of the equation, a dimensionless value is obtained. For the binding of receptor and ligand molecules in solution, the molar Gibbs free energy ΔG, or the binding affinity is related to the dissociation constant K_{d} via

$$\Delta G = R T\ln{{K_{\rm d} \over c^{\ominus}}}$$,

in which R is the ideal gas constant, T temperature and the standard reference concentration c^{~~o~~} = 1 mol/L.

== See also ==
- Binding coefficient
