= Bound & Gagged =

Bound & Gagged may refer to:

- Bound and Gagged (comic strip), a syndicated newspaper comic strip drawn by Dana Summers
- Bound & Gagged (magazine), a gay bondage magazine
- Bound and Gagged (serial), a 1919 spoof film serial
- Bound and Gagged: Pornography and the Politics of Fantasy in America, a 1996 book by Laura Kipnis
