= Bondage =

Bondage may refer to:

== Restraints ==
- Physical restraints
  - Bondage (BDSM), use of restraint for erotic stimulation
    - Self-bondage, use of restraints on oneself for erotic pleasure
    - Bondage pornography, use of restraint for pornography

== Social and economic practices ==
- Serfdom, feudal enslavement of peasants
- Debt bondage, a form of slavery which pledges debtors' labor or services as security for repayment of debt

== In arts and entertainment ==
- Bondage (1917 film), by American director Ida May Park
- Bondage (1933 film), by American director Alfred Santell
- Bondage (2006 film), by American director Eric Allen Bell
- Bondage (play), 1991 work by Chinese-American playwright David Henry Hwang
- Bondage (album), 2009 album by J-pop singer Nana Kitade

== Other uses ==
- Spiritual attachment, such as to physical world or evil compelling force, such as original sin

== See also ==
- Bondsman (disambiguation)
