= Binding Triad =

Proposal to amend the United Nations Charter

The Binding Triad (or World Parliament) is a proposal to amend the United Nations Charter to allow the United Nations General Assembly to pass binding resolutions with the approval of a supermajority of members. For a resolution to be binding, it would require the support of nations:

- Comprising a majority of members of the United Nations.
- Whose combined contributions in dues comprise a majority of the U.N. budget.
- Whose combined populations comprise a majority of the world population.

The Binding Triad appeals to some world federalists because it could theoretically institute a world government with only one change to the U.N. Charter. However, further amendments would be needed to secure representative government. In addition, it is unclear what impact such a change would have on the role of the United Nations Security Council, which enacts and enforces its own resolutions.

== Proposal ==
Richard Hudson (Executive Director, Center for War/Peace Studies, New York) argues that the U.N. can become a world parliament, making global decisions on wars. The key notion is the adoption of a new three-part decision-making rule by all U.N. members. The nations would accept as "binding" decisions those resolutions that carried two-thirds of the General Assembly (see above).

Hudson held three weekend "mock U.N. sessions" where the participants are actually from the diplomatic corps of U.N. members. These conferences are "trials" on how the new decision-making might go in "real life".

== Limitations ==
Two general decision limits are obtained. First, the U.N. would never make decisions about any nation's internal affairs, but only its international ones. Second, the U.N. would not have military forces of its own. Doubts would be referred to the U.N.'s World Court for resolution. Hudson also fields a few of the tough questions raised by his scheme. This ending, of course, invites viewers to their own questions about the scheme.

The Comprehensive Nuclear-Test-Ban Treaty has been ratified by ~91% of UN members, constituting 51.8% of the population and 50.08% of the United Nations dues as of 2024, demonstrating an example of an unenforceable decision despite meeting all three components of the binding triad.

The United States embargo against Cuba has been deemed illegal under international law by a peak (in 2018) of ~99% of UN members, constituting 95.6% of the population and 77.5% of the United Nations dues, but this is also unenforceable.

== See also ==
- Qualified majority vote - A similar system implemented in the European Union
