= Binding of Ishmael =

Narrative in Islamic tradition

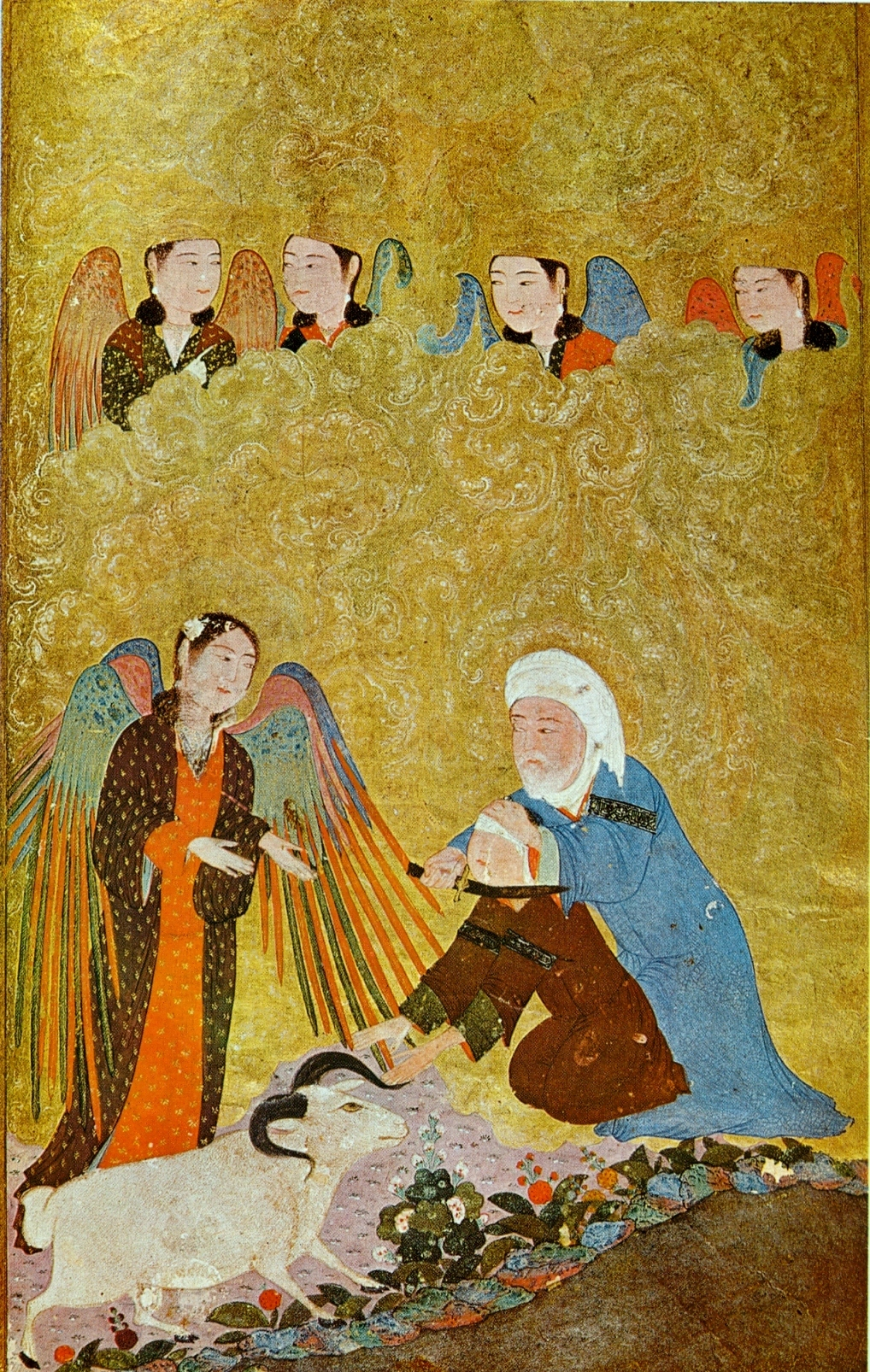
Ibrahim's Sacrifice. Timurid Anthology, 1410–11

The Binding of Ishmael (Arabic: عَقْد إِسْمَاعِيل, romanized: ʿAqd Ismāʿīl) refers to the narrative in Islamic tradition where Abraham is commanded by God to sacrifice his son, generally believed by Muslims to be Ishmael, though the Qur'an does not explicitly name the son. This contrasts with the Tawrat (the Arabic term for the Torah in Islamic context), which identifies Isaac as the son to be sacrificed in the Binding of Isaac. The story, known as the dhabih in Islamic tradition, is believed to have originated as an oral narrative, marked by variability and creative flexibility across versions, as noted by scholar Norman Calder. The narrative holds significant theological and cultural importance in Islam, particularly in relation to Eid al-Adha and the themes of obedience and sacrifice.

== Narrative ==
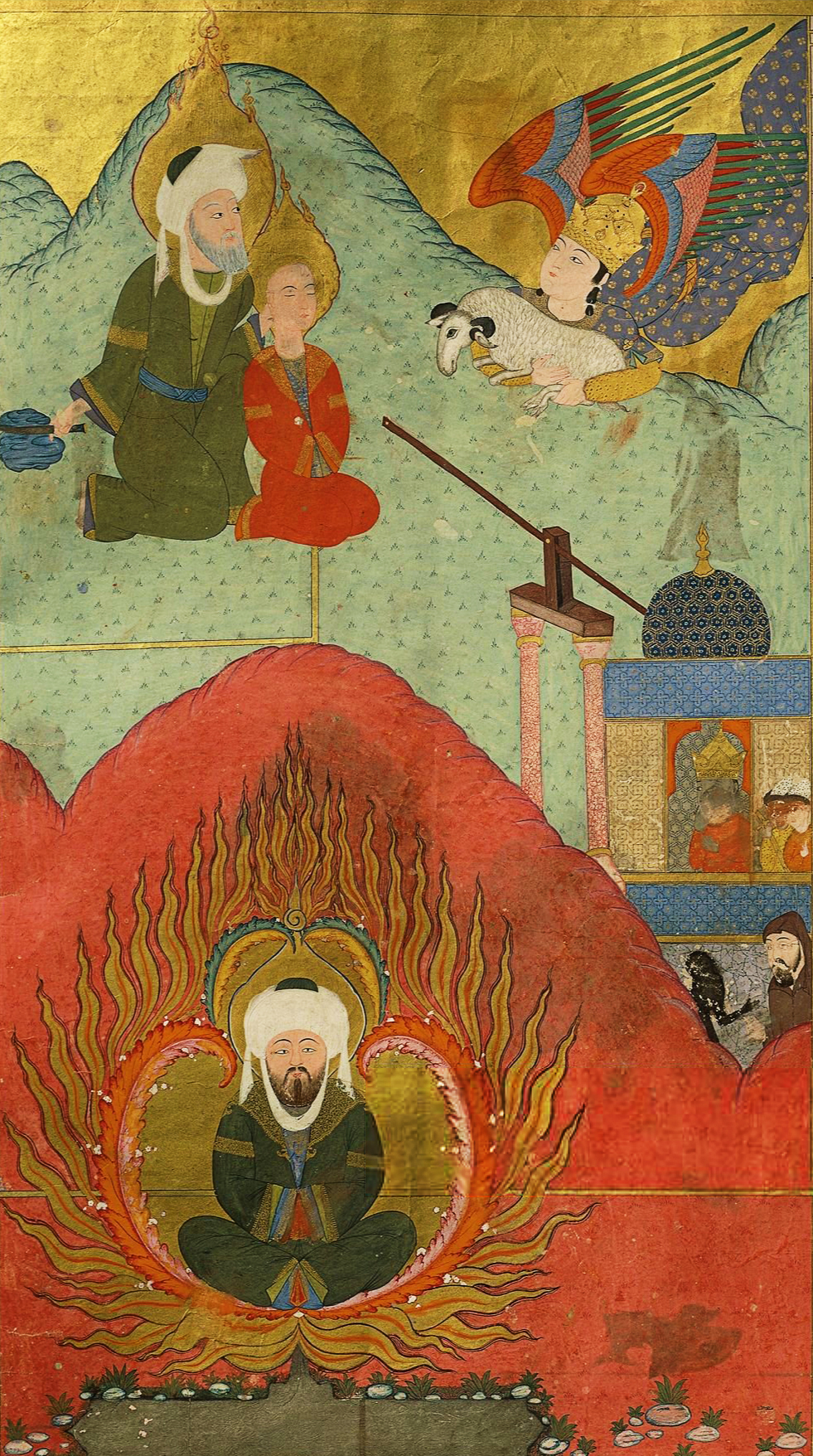
Abraham sacrificing his son, Ishmael; and Abraham cast into fire by Nimrod. A miniature in the 16th-century Ottoman Turkish manuscript Zubdat Al-Tawarikh

The Islamic narrative of the Binding of Ishmael portrays the sacrifice as either a divine test or fulfillment of a vow. In some versions, the devil attempts to dissuade Hagar, Ishmael, and Abraham from obeying God's command, but each responds with steadfast commitment to divine will. Abraham informs Ishmael of the command, and Ishmael willingly consents, encouraging his father to obey God. In certain accounts, Ishmael provides specific instructions to ensure unwavering resolve, such as bringing his shirt back to Hagar, binding him tightly, sharpening the knife, and placing him face down.

As Abraham attempts to sacrifice Ishmael, divine intervention occurs: either the knife is turned in Abraham's hand or copper appears on Ishmael to prevent the act. God then declares that Abraham has fulfilled the command. Unlike the Biblical account, which features a ram as a substitute, the Qur'an describes the replacement as a "great sacrifice" (dhibḥin ʿaẓīm), interpreted by some as symbolizing the institutionalization of sacrifice or the future sacrifices of the Islamic prophet Muhammad and his companions, who are considered descendants of Ishmael. Later Islamic historiographic literature incorporates the Biblical element of a ram being sacrificed instead of Ishmael.

== Significance in Islam ==
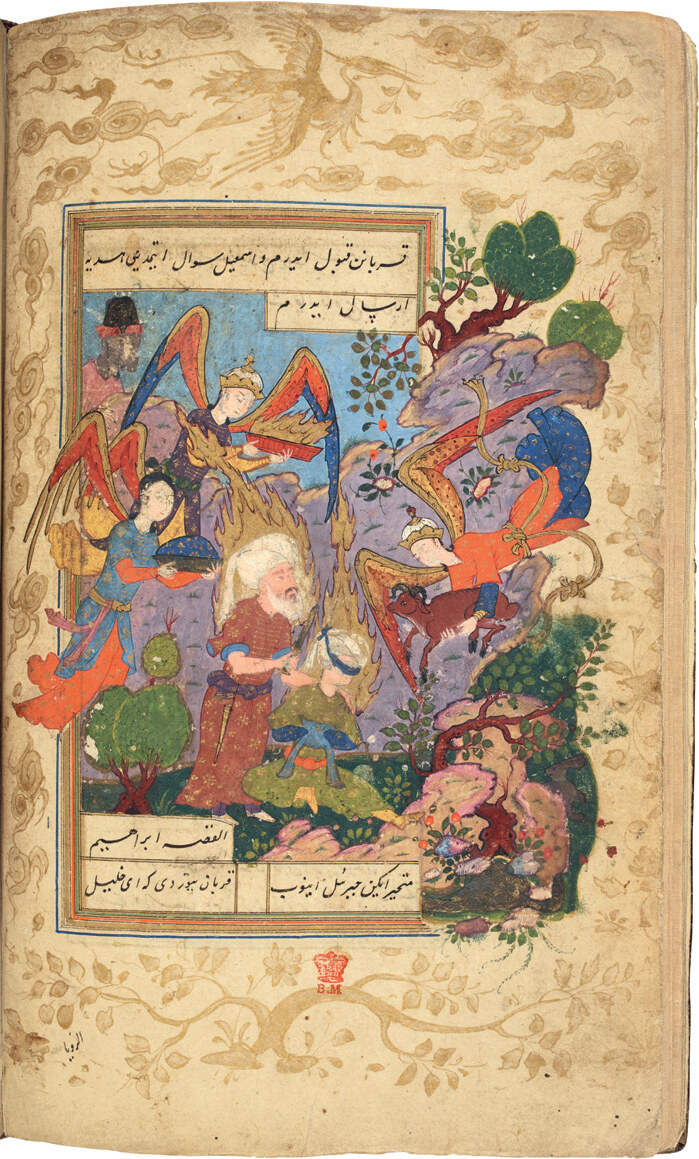
Abraham offers Ishmael for sacrifice, but is prevented by the angel Gabriel (Turkish miniature, c. 1700)

The narrative of Ishmael's willingness to be sacrificed underscores his role as a model of hospitality and obedience in Islam. Unlike the Biblical account, where the son is unaware of the plan, the Qur'anic version depicts Abraham discussing the command with his son, who consents and ensures both remain steadfast in their obedience to God. This portrayal emphasizes Ishmael's surrender to divine will, a core virtue in Islamic theology.

The story is commemorated annually during Eid al-Adha, when Muslims worldwide slaughter an animal to honor Abraham's sacrifice and reflect on self-abnegation in devotion to God. The narrative also underscores the religious significance of Mecca, connecting the story to the Islamic pilgrimage.

== Scholarly debate ==
There is significant debate among Muslim scholars and historiographers regarding whether Ishmael or Isaac was the intended sacrifice.

The story appeared in the Jewish Bible over a millennia before the arrival of Islam - as the binding of Isaac. Yet approximately 131 traditions support Isaac, while 133 favor Ishmael, reflecting the story's importance and the lack of a definitive name in the Qur'an. Some scholars argue that the narrative was adapted from rabbinic texts to enhance Mecca's religious significance and connect it to the Islamic pilgrimage. Proponents of Ishmael as the intended sacrifice cite arguments such as the jealousy of Jews claiming Isaac, the historical presence of the ram's horns in the Kaaba, and the Qur'anic sequence where Abraham is informed of Isaac's birth after the sacrifice narrative, suggesting Ishmael was the son involved. The multiplicity of interpretations highlights the story's theological and cultural weight in Islamic tradition.

== See also ==
- Binding of Isaac
- Child sacrifice
- Covenant of the pieces
- Eid al-Adha
- Fear and Trembling
- Filicide
- Iphigenia
- Jephthah's daughter
- Phrixus in Greek mythology, child sacrifice thwarted by ram
- Tophet
- Vayeira, the parashah containing the binding of Isaac
