= The Sacrifice of Isaac (Rembrandt) =

Painting by Rembrandt

Sacrifice of Isaac
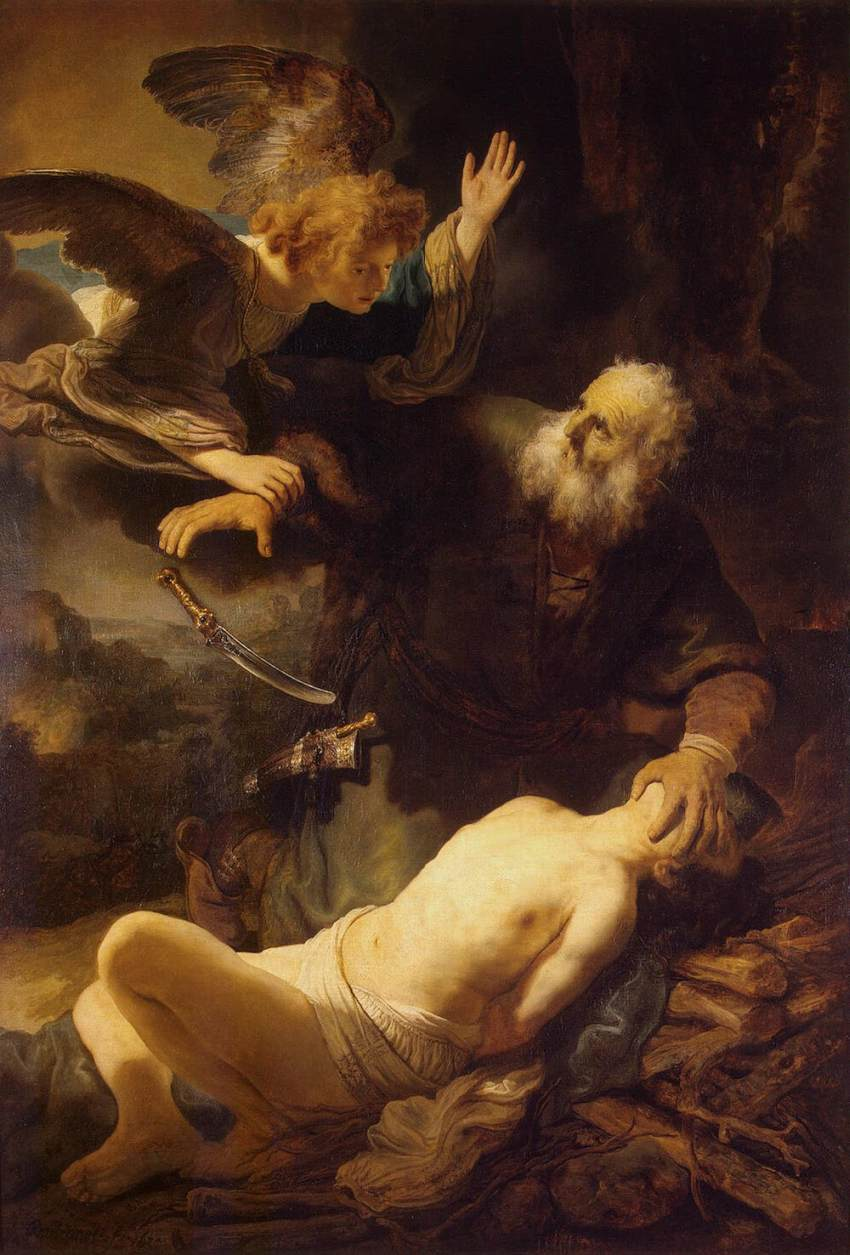
- Artist: Rembrandt
- Year: 1635
- Medium: Oil on canvas
- Dimensions: 193 cm × 132 cm (76 in × 52 in)
- Location: The State Hermitage Museum, St Petersburg

The Sacrifice of Isaac is a 1635 autograph oil on canvas work by Rembrandt, now in the Hermitage Museum. A copy of it dating to 1636 is now in the Alte Pinakothek in Munich.
