= Binder FBM =

Friedrich Binder GmbH & Co. KG
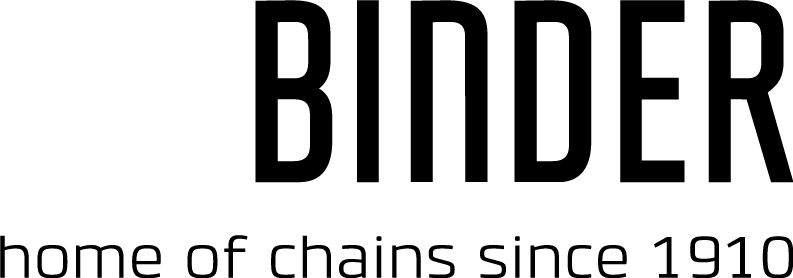
- Type: family-owned
- Industry: jewelry
- Founded: 1910
- Headquarters: Mönsheim, Germany
- Area served: Worldwide
- Number of employees: 200
- Website: www.binder-fbm.com

The Friedrich Binder GmbH & Co. KG, Founded by Friedrich Binder (1847 in Mönsheim – November 1933), is a German jewelry manufactory in Mönsheim, Baden-Württemberg and family-owned in the fourth generation.

== History ==
The Friedrich Binder company was founded by the chain maker, Friedrich Binder, in Mönsheim in March 1910. For more than half a century, jewellery chains were predominantly handcrafted and a variety of chains were produced as piece work for the neighboring Pforzheim jewellery industry.
