= Binding coefficient =

In medicinal chemistry and pharmacology, a binding coefficient is a quantity representing the extent to which a chemical compound will bind to a macromolecule. The preferential binding coefficient can be derived from the Kirkwood-Buff solution theory of solutions. Preferential binding is defined as a thermodynamic expression that describes the binding of the cosolvent over the solvent. This is in a system that is open to both the solvent and cosolvent. Consequently, preferential interaction coefficients are measures of interactions that involve “solutes that participate in a reaction in solution.”

== See also ==
- Binding constant
- Partition coefficient
- Binding affinity
