= Growth curve (biology) =

Empirical model of the evolution of a population or biomass over time

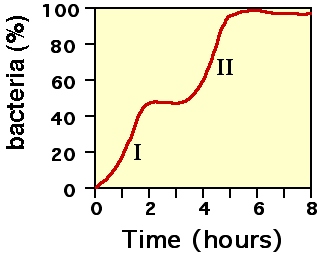
Figure 1: A bi-phasic bacterial growth curve.

A growth curve is an empirical model of the evolution of a quantity over time. Growth curves are widely used in biology for quantities such as population size or biomass (in population ecology and demography, for population growth analysis), individual body height or biomass (in physiology, for growth analysis of individuals). Values for the measured property

== Bacterial growth ==
In this example (Figure 1, see Lac operon for details) the number of bacteria present in a nutrient-containing broth was measured during the course of an 8-hour cell growth experiment. The observed pattern of bacterial growth is bi-phasic because two different sugars were present, glucose and lactose. The bacteria prefer to consume glucose (Phase I) and only use the lactose (Phase II) after the glucose has been depleted. Analysis of the molecular basis for this bi-phasic growth curve led to the discovery of the basic mechanisms that control gene expression.

== Cancer cell growth ==
Cancer research is an area of biology where growth curve analysis plays an important role. In many types of cancer, the rate at which tumors shrink following chemotherapy is related to the rate of tumor growth before treatment. Tumors that grow rapidly are generally more sensitive to the toxic effects that conventional anticancer drugs have on the cancer cells. Many conventional anticancer drugs (for example, 5-Fluorouracil) interfere with DNA replication and can cause the death of cells that attempt to replicate their DNA and divide. A rapidly growing tumor will have more actively dividing cells and more cell death upon exposure to such anticancer drugs.

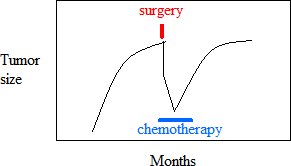
Figure 2. Tumor growth curve.

In the example shown in Figure 2, a tumor is found after the cell growth rate has slowed. Most of the cancer cells are removed by surgery. The remaining cancer cells begin to proliferate rapidly and cancer chemotherapy is started. Many tumor cells are killed by the chemotherapy, but eventually some cancer cells that are resistant to the chemotherapy drug begin to grow rapidly. The chemotherapy is no longer useful and is discontinued.

== The growth of children ==
Children who fall significantly below the normal range of growth curves for body height can be tested for growth hormone deficiency and might be treatable with hormone injections.

Female Stature vs Age (US CDC)

Male Stature vs Age (US CDC)

== Exponential growth ==
Some growth curves for certain biological systems display periods of exponential growth. Typically, periods of exponential growth are of limited duration due to depletion of some rate-limiting resource.

== See also ==
- Gompertz function
- Exponential curve (J-curve)
- Logistic curve (sigmoid curve, S-curve)
- Von Bertalanffy function

== Bibliography ==
- Kahm, M. and Hasenbrink, G. and Lichtenberg-Fraté, H. and Ludwig, J. and Kschischo, M. (2010). "grofit: Fitting Biological Growth Curves with R". Journal of Statistical Software. Vol. 33, no. 7. pp. 1–21.
