= Francis John Richards =

English plant physiologist

Francis John Richards FRS
- Born: 1 October 1901; Burton upon Trent, England
- Died: 2 January 1965 (aged 63)
- Education: University of Birmingham (BS, MSc)
- Known for: First description of the generalised logistic function
- Scientific career
- Fields: Plant physiology
- Workplaces: Imperial College Institute of Plant Physiology; Wye College
- Academic advisors: Richard Henry Yapp; J.R. Elliot

Francis John Richards FRS (1 October 1901 – 2 January 1965) was an English plant physiologist who specialized in quantitative studies on the mineral nutrition requirements of crops. He first described the general form of the generalised logistic function in 1959.

== Early life and education ==
Richards was born at Burton-on-Trent, the third child of Robert with two brothers and a sister. His eldest brother died in World War I and the other brother took over the family business as a butcher. Richards took an interest in natural history and astronomy at young age. He attended the Burton-on-Trent Grammar School and took an interest in biology, encouraged by his schoolmaster Storer. He earned higher certificates in mathematics with subsidiary physics and chemistry in 1919 and in biology with distinction in 1920.

In 1921, Richards began his studies at Birmingham University. Under the direction of R. H. Yapp, Richards studied salt marsh ecology and led surveys of Dovey estuary. He graduated with honors in Botany and Biochemistry in 1924 and stayed for 18 months to complete his MSc degree on fungal respiration with J. R. Elliot.

== Career ==
Richards joined the Imperial College Institute of Plant Physiology at the Rothamsted Experimental Station in April 1926. There, he worked with F.G. Gregory to quantitatively define the effect of minerals such as nitrogen, potassium, and phosphorus on cereal crop growth, using barley as a model. Richards was notable among his contemporaries by applying R.A. Fisher's new statistical methods for correlation and variance analysis. He introduced diagrammatic representations for results from factorial experimental designs. He continued to study the effects of mineral nutrition on plant physiology by examining respiration and assimilation under various mineral deficiencies. This yielded several discoveries regarding carbohydrate and protein metabolism. Nitrogen deficiency did not affect plants' protein or nitrogen content, but limited respiration rate. Phosphorus deficiency impaired protein synthesis, but excess phosphorus could indicate a lack of potassium through respiration. Finally, potassium level was shown to indirectly modify many of these processes depending on the particular balance of deficiencies or excesses.

Richards's interest in potassium inspired several lines of further research. He demonstrated that rubidium could partially replace some functions of potassium. Through factorial experiment design, he found significant interactions between potassium, carbohydrate, and water content which he speculated to explain previously reported discrepancies in the literature regarding the control of leaf succulence. He also studied amino acid distribution in leaves under various mineral deficient conditions and found that putrescine accumulated during growth of barley seedlings lacking potassium. Conversely, putrescine supplementation could induce the symptoms of potassium deficiency. Furthermore, different plants such as flax and clover showed accumulation of different compounds related to the putrescine synthesis pathway.

Richards also engaged in mathematical modeling. He devised a new method to describe phyllotaxis using the tangential and radial spacing of a given plant apex. He extended the von Bertalanffy function to a class of flexible sigmoid growth functions later known as the generalised logistic function.

Richards was elected to the Royal Society in 1954. Following the retirement of Gregory in December 1958, Richards became director of the new Unit of Plant Nutrition and Morphogenesis at Rothamsted, moving to Wye College in 1961. During his career, he served as executive editor of Plant and Soil and associate editor of the Journal of Experimental Biology.

== Personal life ==
Richards had a wife, who assisted in his research at Dovey. They had two daughters. He was known by his colleagues to hold a wide variety of hobbies, including archaeology, photography, number theory, and natural history. He made his own reflecting telescope and bred and collected Lepidoptera.
