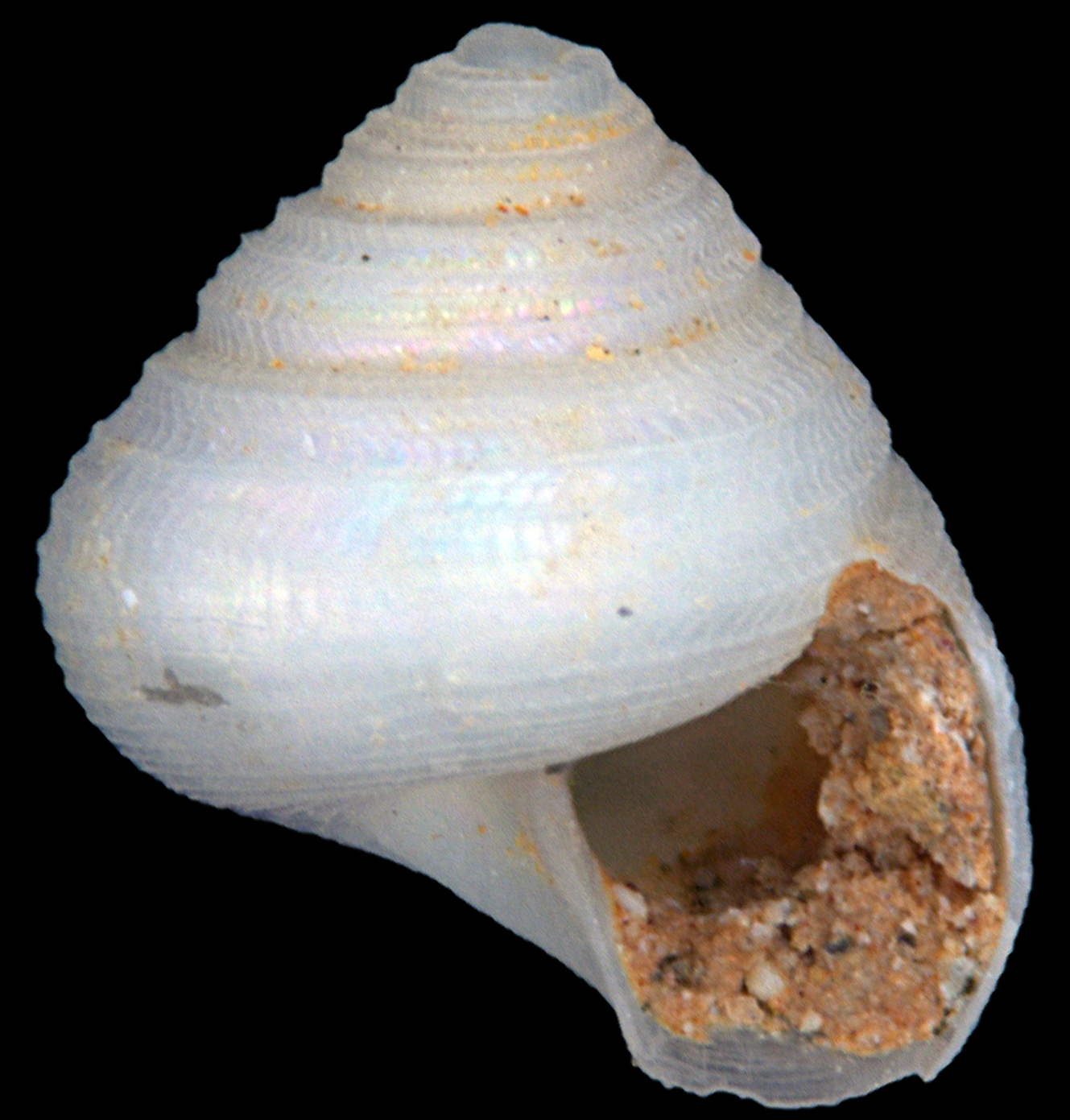
- Apertural view of an empty shell of a paratype of H. umberlee

Scientific classification
- Kingdom: Animalia
- Phylum: Mollusca
- Class: Gastropoda
- Subclass: Vetigastropoda
- Superfamily: Seguenzioidea
- Family: Seguenziidae
- Subfamily: Seguenziinae
- Genus: Halystina
- Species: H. umberlee

Binomial name
- Halystina umberlee Salvador, Cavallari & Simone, 2014

= Halystina umberlee =

Species of gastropod

Halystina umberlee is a species of very small deep-water sea snail, a marine gastropod mollusc in the family Seguenziidae.

== Taxonomy ==
Halystina umberlee belongs in the genus Halystina, a group of small-sized sea snails with a rounded shell profile, flat-sided whorls and finely granulate protoconch. It is considered to resemble species in the genus Halystes, differing only by its much smaller size. It was named after Umberlee, a fictional goddess from the Faerûnian pantheon of the Forgotten Realms campaign setting for the Dungeons & Dragons fantasy role-playing game.

== Description ==
Halystina umberlee is a very small species, barely reaching a shell height of 2 mm. It has a rounded, conic to turbinate shell, with relatively thick walls and up to 5 whorls. Its bulbous protoconch consists of a single whorl with a pitted surface, and the protoconch-teleoconch transition is marked by a thin line. The teleoconch has 4 convex whorls, sculptured by delicate spiral cordlets crossed by axial threads, forming a delicate net-like pattern. The axial threads form an overall continuous sigmoid pattern along the shell's longitudinal axis, and the spiral sculpture becomes gradually weaker toward the basal region of last whorl. The basal part of the shell is sculptured by 10-12 spiral cords, but the umbilical region is smooth, with a well-marked margin. The aperture is quadrangular, and bears three deep sinuses. The shell is colored glossy white, with a nacreous shade.

== Distribution ==
This marine species occurs off southeastern Brazil, from Espírito Santo to Rio de Janeiro, at 950–1550 m depths.
