= Logistic model =

Logistic model may refer to:

- Logistic function – a continuous sigmoidal curve
- Logistic map – a discrete version, which exhibits chaotic behavior
- Logistic regression
