= Logistic equation =

Logistic equation can refer to:

- Logistic function, a common S-shaped equation and curve with applications in a wide range of fields.
- Logistic map, a nonlinear recurrence relation that plays a prominent role in chaos theory
- Logistic regression, a regression technique that transforms the dependent variable using the logistic function
- Logistic differential equation, a differential equation for population dynamics proposed by Pierre François Verhulst
