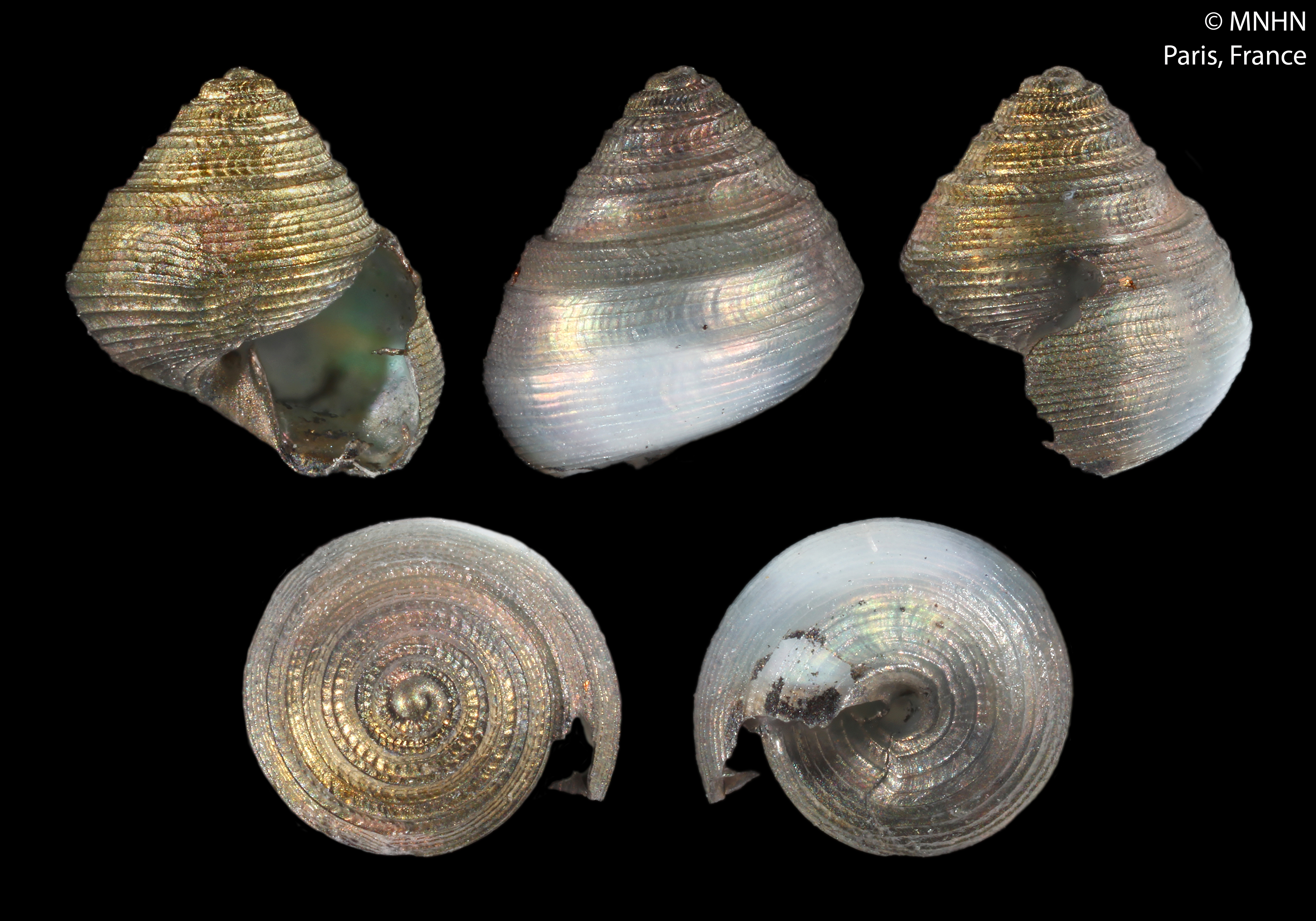
- Shell of Halystina vaubani (holotype at MNHN, Paris)

Scientific classification
- Kingdom: Animalia
- Phylum: Mollusca
- Class: Gastropoda
- Subclass: Vetigastropoda
- Superfamily: Seguenzioidea
- Family: Seguenziidae
- Subfamily: Seguenziinae
- Genus: Halystina
- Species: H. vaubani

Binomial name
- Halystina vaubani Marshall, 1991

= Halystina vaubani =

Species of gastropod

Halystina vaubani is a species of extremely small deep water sea snail, a marine gastropod mollusk in the family Seguenziidae.

== Description ==
The length of the shell attains 1.8 mm.

== Distribution ==
This marine species occurs off New Caledonia and southern Vanuatu.
