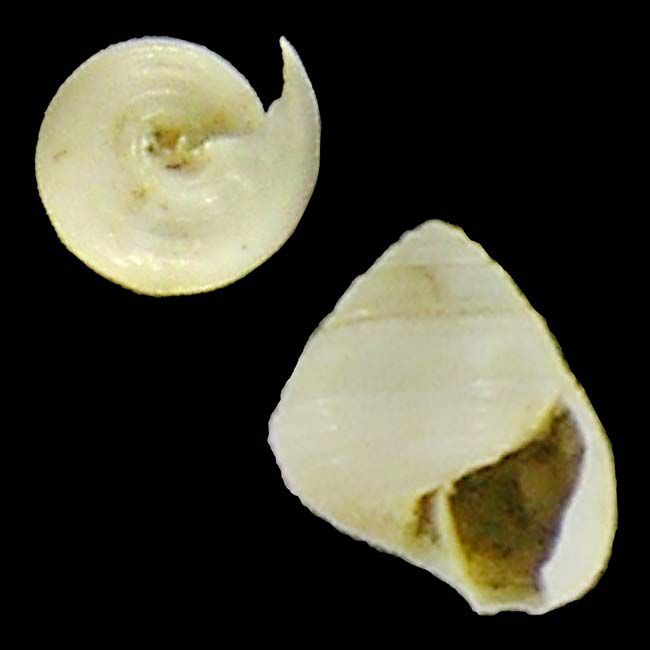

Scientific classification
- Kingdom: Animalia
- Phylum: Mollusca
- Class: Gastropoda
- Subclass: Vetigastropoda
- Family: Seguenziidae
- Genus: Halystina
- Species: H. globulus

Binomial name
- Halystina globulus Poppe, Tagaro & Dekker, 2006

= Halystina globulus =

Species of gastropod

Halystina globulus is a species of sea snail, a marine gastropod mollusc in the family Seguenziidae. The scientific name of Halystina globulus comes from the Greek words "Halys" (meaning sea) and "Stena" (meaning chest), referring to the location of the snail's body within its shell.

== Description ==
Halystina globulus has a small, smooth, and glossy shell that is globular or oval-shaped, with a height of up to 5 mm and a width of up to 4 mm. The shell is thin, fragile, and translucent, with a white to yellowish-brown coloration. The snail has a small, conical spire and a round aperture with a thin, sharp outer lip. The surface of the shell is smooth, with fine and closely spaced growth lines and a few spiral lines on the base. The operculum is thin and corneous, with a brown coloration.

== Distribution ==
Halystina globulus is found in deep waters of the Southwest Pacific Ocean, specifically around New Zealand and Australia.

== Habitat ==
Halystina globulus is a benthic species that is at depths ranging from 200 to 1,100 meters, and it typically lives on muddy or sandy substrates. It is commonly found in the southeastern Pacific Ocean, including off the coast of Chile, Peru, and Ecuador. Due to its deep-water habitat, humans do not commonly encounter the species.
