= Halystina simplex =

Scientific classification
- Kingdom: Animalia
- Phylum: Mollusca
- Class: Gastropoda
- Subclass: Vetigastropoda
- Superfamily: Seguenzioidea
- Family: Seguenziidae
- Subfamily: Seguenziinae
- Genus: Halystina
- Species: H. simplex

Binomial name
- Halystina simplex (Barnard, 1963)

Synonyms
- Seguenzia simplex Barnard, 1963

Species of gastropod

Halystina simplex is a species of extremely small deep water sea snail, a marine gastropod mollusk in the family Seguenziidae.
