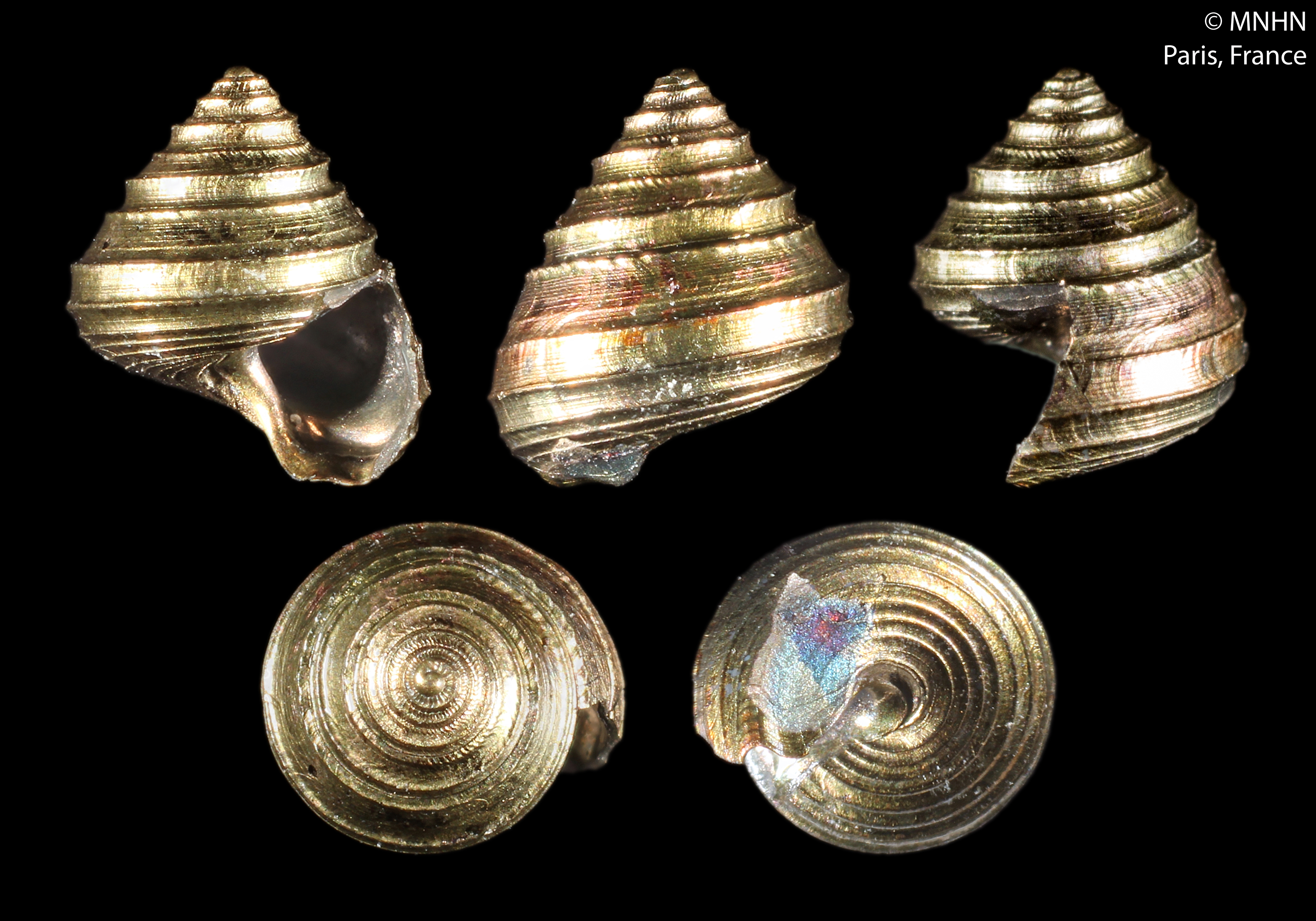

Scientific classification
- Kingdom: Animalia
- Phylum: Mollusca
- Class: Gastropoda
- Subclass: Vetigastropoda
- Superfamily: Seguenzioidea
- Family: Seguenziidae
- Subfamily: Seguenziinae
- Genus: Halystina
- Species: H. carinata

Binomial name
- Halystina carinata Marshall, 1991

= Halystina carinata =

Species of gastropod

Halystina carinata is a species of extremely small deep water sea snail, a marine gastropod mollusk in the family Seguenziidae.

== Distribution ==
This marine species occurs off the Loyalty Islands, New Caledonia.
