= Von Bertalanffy function =

Growth curve model

The von Bertalanffy growth function (VBGF), or von Bertalanffy curve, is a type of growth curve for a time series and is named after Ludwig von Bertalanffy. It is a special case of the generalised logistic function. The growth curve is used to model mean length from age in animals. The function is commonly applied in ecology to model fish growth and in paleontology to model sclerochronological parameters of shell growth.

The model can be written as the following:

$$L(a)= L_\infty(1-\exp(-k(a-t_0)))$$

where $a$ is age, $k$ is the growth coefficient, $t_0$ is the theoretical age when size is zero, and $L_\infty$ is asymptotic size. It is the solution of the following linear differential equation:

$$\frac{dL}{da} = k (L_{\infty} - L )$$

== History ==
In 1920, August Pütter proposed that growth was the result of a balance between anabolism and catabolism. von Bertalanffy, citing Pütter, borrowed this concept and published its equation first in 1941, and elaborated on it later on. The original equation was under the following form:
$$\frac{dW}{dt} = \eta W^m - \kappa W^n$$
with $W$ the weight, $\eta$ and $\kappa$ constants of anabolism and catabolism respectively, and $m$, $n$ constant exponants. Von Bertalanffy gave himself the resulting equation for $W$ as a function of $t$, assuming that $n=1$ and $m \leq 1$ :

$W = \Biggl(\frac{\eta}{\kappa}-\Bigl(\frac{\eta}{\kappa}-W_0^{1-m}\Bigr)e^{-(1-m)\kappa t}\Biggr)^{\frac{1}{1-m}}$

Prior to von Bertalanffy, in 1921, J. A. Murray wrote a similar differential equation, with $m = \frac{2}{3}$, according to the then-called "surface law", and $n = 1$, but Murray's article does not appear in von Bertalanffy's sources.

== Seasonally-adjusted von Bertalanffy ==
The seasonally-adjusted von Bertalanffy is an extension of this function that accounts for organism growth that occurs seasonally. It was created by I. F. Somers in 1988.

== See also ==
- Gompertz function
- Monod equation
- Michaelis–Menten kinetics
