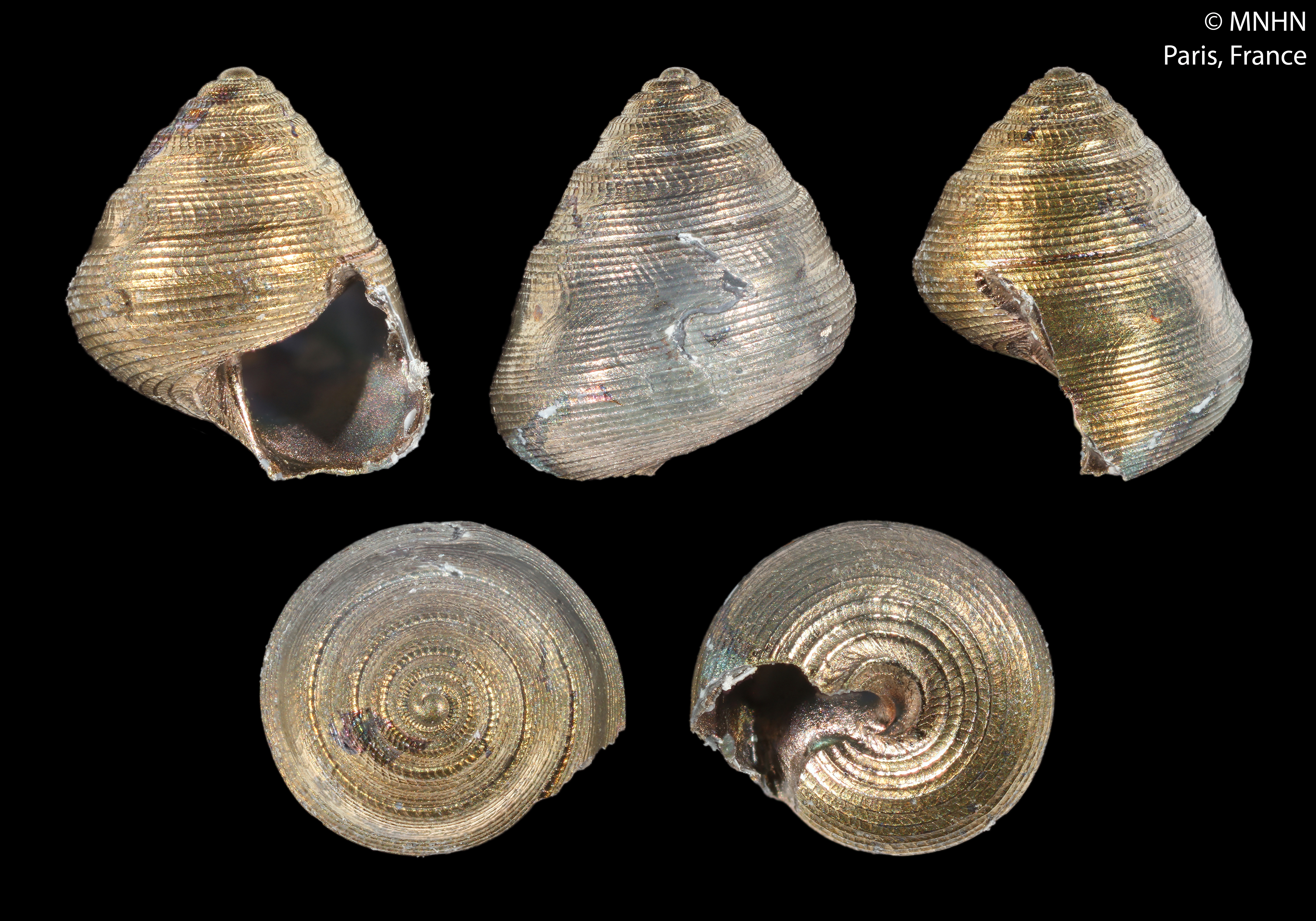
- Shell of Halystina caledonica (hootype at MNHN, Paris)

Scientific classification
- Kingdom: Animalia
- Phylum: Mollusca
- Class: Gastropoda
- Subclass: Vetigastropoda
- Superfamily: Seguenzioidea
- Family: Seguenziidae
- Subfamily: Seguenziinae
- Genus: Halystina
- Species: H. caledonica

Binomial name
- Halystina caledonica Marshall, 1991

= Halystina caledonica =

Species of gastropod

Halystina caledonica is a species of extremely small deep water sea snail, a marine gastropod mollusk in the family Seguenziidae.

== Description ==
The height of the shell varies between 3 mm and 6 mm.

== Distribution ==
This marine species occurs off New Caledonia.
