= Halystina siberutensis =

Scientific classification
- Kingdom: Animalia
- Phylum: Mollusca
- Class: Gastropoda
- Subclass: Vetigastropoda
- Superfamily: Seguenzioidea
- Family: Seguenziidae
- Subfamily: Seguenziinae
- Genus: Halystina
- Species: H. siberutensis

Binomial name
- Halystina siberutensis (Thiele, 1925)

Synonyms
- Seguenzia siberutensis Thiele, 1925 (original description)

Species of gastropod

Halystina siberutensis is a species of extremely small deep water sea snail, a marine gastropod mollusk in the family Seguenziidae.
