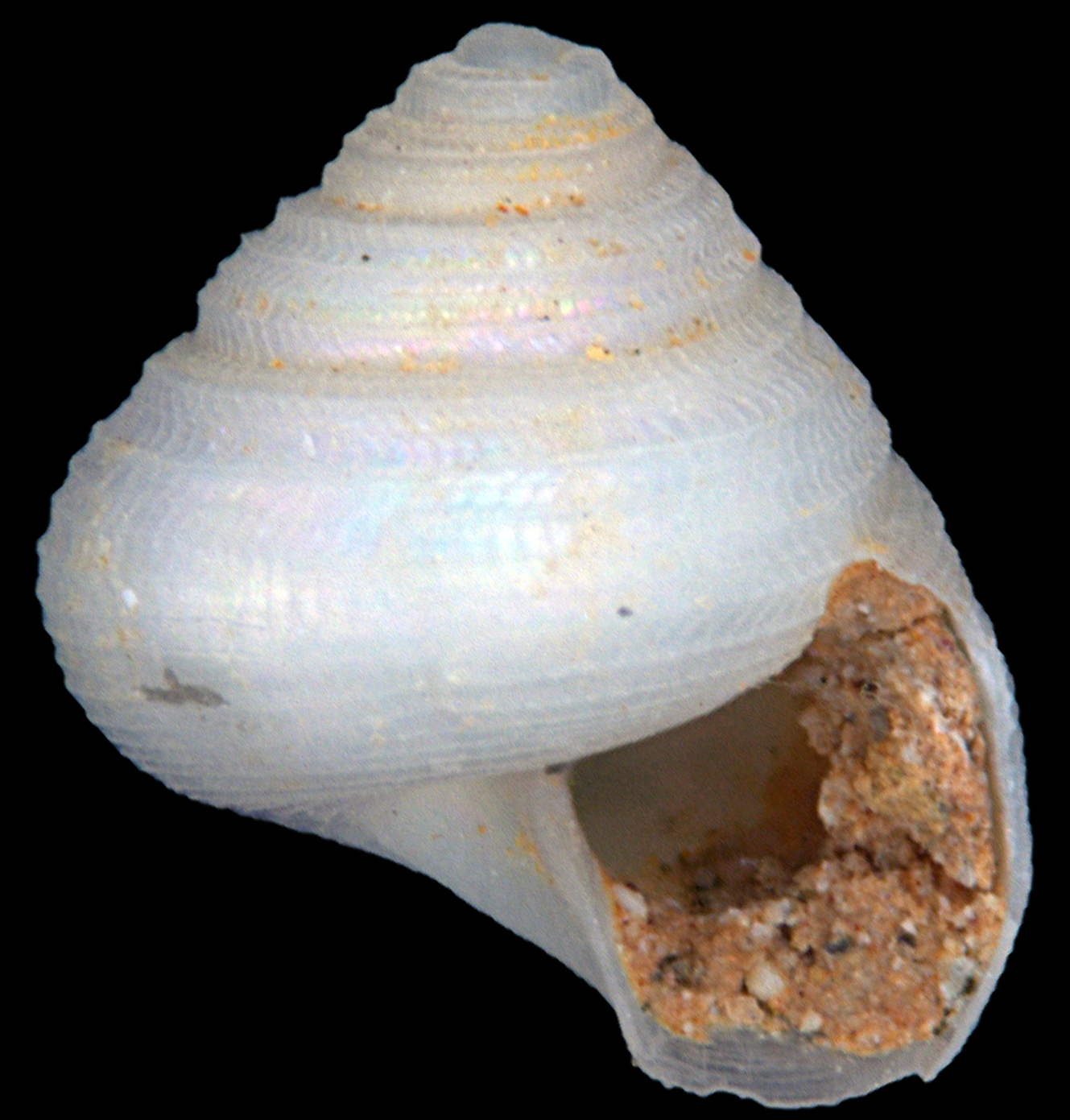
- Halystina umberlee shell

Scientific classification
- Kingdom: Animalia
- Phylum: Mollusca
- Class: Gastropoda
- Subclass: Vetigastropoda
- Superfamily: Seguenzioidea
- Family: Seguenziidae
- Subfamily: Seguenziinae
- Genus: Halystina; A. Marshall, 1991

Type species
- Halystina caledonica Marshall, B.A., 1991

= Halystina =

Genus of gastropods

Halystina is a genus of sea snails, marine gastropod mollusks in the subfamily Seguenziinae of the family Seguenziidae.

== Species ==
Species within the genus Halystina include:

- Halystina caledonica Marshall, 1991
- Halystina carinata Marshall, 1991
- † Halystina conoidea Helwerda, Wesselingh & S. T. Williams, 2014
- Halystina globulus Poppe, Tagaro & Dekker, 2006
- Halystina siberutensis (Thiele, 1925)
- Halystina simplex (Barnard, 1963)
- Halystina umberlee Salvador, Cavallari & Simone, 2014
- Halystina vaubani Marshall, 1991
