= Generalised logistic function =

Mathematical function

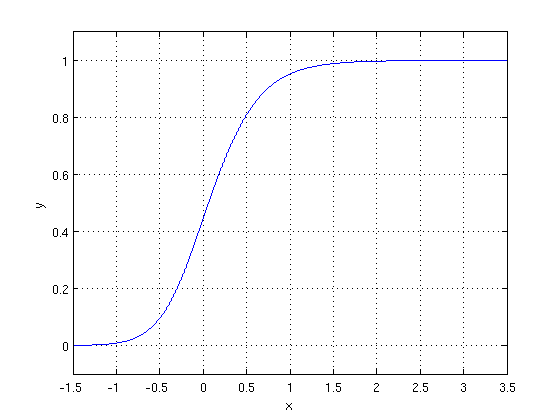
A=M=0, K=C=1, B=3, ν=0.5, Q=0.5

Effect of varying parameter A. All other parameters are 1.

Effect of varying parameter B. A = 0, all other parameters are 1.

Effect of varying parameter C. A = 0, all other parameters are 1.

Effect of varying parameter K. A = 0, all other parameters are 1.

Effect of varying parameter Q. A = 0, all other parameters are 1.

Effect of varying parameter $\nu$. A = 0, all other parameters are 1.

The generalized logistic function or curve is an extension of the logistic or sigmoid functions. Originally developed for growth modelling, it allows for more flexible S-shaped curves. The function is sometimes named Richards's curve after F. J. Richards, who proposed the general form for the family of models in 1959.

== Definition ==
Richards's curve has the following form:

$$Y(t) = A + { K-A \over (C + Q e^{-B t}) ^ {1 / \nu} }$$

where $Y$ = weight, height, size etc., and $t$ = time. It has six parameters:

- $A$: the left horizontal asymptote;
- $K$: the right horizontal asymptote when $C=1$. If $A=0$ and $C=1$ then $K$ is called the carrying capacity;
- $B$: the growth rate;
- $\nu > 0$ : affects near which asymptote maximum growth occurs.
- $Q$: is related to the value $Y(0)$
- $C$: typically takes a value of 1. Otherwise, the upper asymptote is $A + {K - A \over C^{\, 1 / \nu}}$

The equation can also be written:

$$Y(t) = A + { K-A \over (C + e^{-B(t - M)}) ^ {1 / \nu} }$$

where $M$ can be thought of as a starting time, at which $Y(M) = A + { K-A \over (C+1) ^ {1 / \nu} }$. Including both $Q$ and $M$ can be convenient:

$$Y(t) = A + { K-A \over (C + Q e^{-B(t - M)}) ^ {1 / \nu} }$$

this representation simplifies the setting of both a starting time and the value of $Y$ at that time.

The logistic function, with maximum growth rate at time $M$, is the case where $Q = \nu = 1$.

== Generalised logistic differential equation ==
A particular case of the generalised logistic function is:

$$Y(t) =  { K \over (1 + Q e^{- \alpha \nu (t - t_0)}) ^ {1 / \nu} }$$

which is the solution of the Richards's differential equation (RDE):

$$Y^{\prime}(t) = \alpha  \left(1 - \left(\frac{Y}{K} \right)^{\nu} \right)Y$$

with initial condition

$$Y(t_0) = Y_0$$

where

$$Q = -1 + \left(\frac {K}{Y_0} \right)^{\nu}$$

provided that $\nu > 0$ and $\alpha > 0$

The classical logistic differential equation is a particular case of the above equation, with $\nu =1$, whereas the Gompertz curve can be recovered in the limit $\nu \rightarrow 0^+$ provided that:

$$\alpha = O\left(\frac{1}{\nu}\right)$$

In fact, for small $\nu$ it is

$$Y^{\prime}(t)  = Y r \frac{1-\exp\left(\nu \ln\left(\frac{Y}{K}\right) \right)}{\nu} \approx r Y \ln\left(\frac{Y}{K}\right)$$

The RDE models many growth phenomena, arising in fields such as oncology and epidemiology.

== Gradient of generalized logistic function ==
When estimating parameters from data, it is often necessary to compute the partial derivatives of the logistic function with respect to parameters at a given data point $t$ (see). For the case where $C = 1$,

$$\begin{align}
\\
\frac{\partial Y}{\partial A} &= 1 - (1 + Qe^{-B(t-M)})^{-1/\nu}\\
\\
\frac{\partial Y}{\partial K} &= (1 + Qe^{-B(t-M)})^{-1/\nu}\\
\\
\frac{\partial Y}{\partial B} &= \frac{(K-A)(t-M)Qe^{-B(t-M)}}{\nu(1 + Qe^{-B(t-M)})^{\frac{1}{\nu}+1}}\\
\\
\frac{\partial Y}{\partial \nu} &= \frac{(K-A)\ln(1 + Qe^{-B(t-M)})}{\nu^2(1 + Qe^{-B(t-M)})^{\frac{1}{\nu}}}\\
\\
\frac{\partial Y}{\partial Q} &= -\frac{(K-A)e^{-B(t-M)}}{\nu(1 + Qe^{-B(t-M)})^{\frac{1}{\nu}+1}}\\
\\
\frac{\partial Y}{\partial M} &= -\frac{(K-A)QBe^{-B(t-M)}}{\nu(1 + Qe^{-B(t-M)})^{\frac{1}{\nu}+1}}
\\
\end{align}$$

== Special cases ==
The following functions are specific cases of Richards's curves:

- Logistic function
- Gompertz curve
- Von Bertalanffy function
- Monomolecular curve
