= Growth curve (statistics) =

Specific multivariate linear model

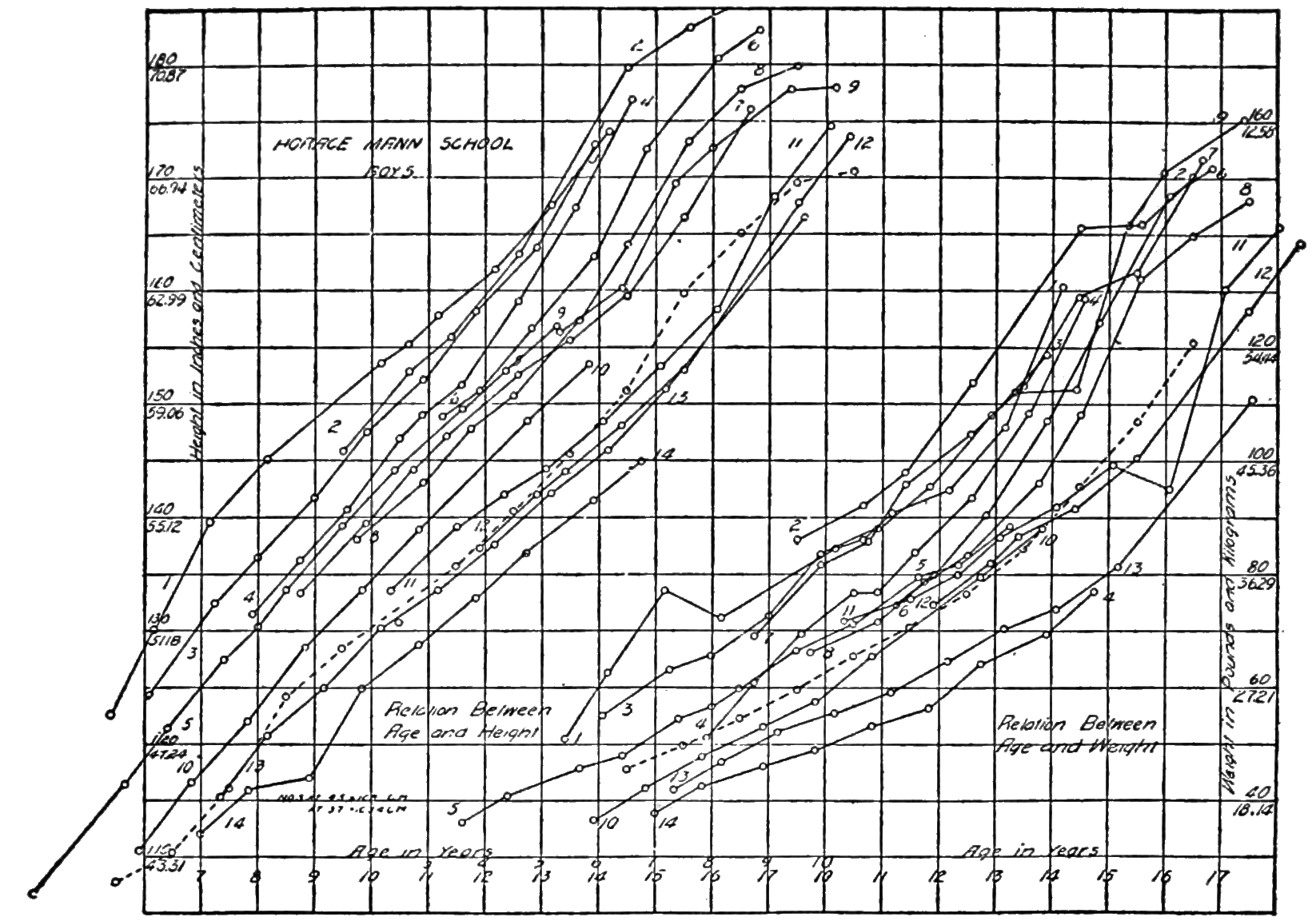
Table of height and weight for boys over time. The growth curve model (also known as GMANOVA) is used to analyze data such as this, where multiple observations are made on collections of individuals over time.

The growth curve model in statistics is a specific multivariate linear model, also known as GMANOVA (Generalized Multivariate Analysis-Of-Variance). It generalizes MANOVA by allowing post-matrices, as seen in the definition.

== Definition ==
Growth curve model: Let X be a p×n random matrix corresponding to the observations, A a p×q within design matrix with q ≤ p, B a q×k parameter matrix, C a k×n between individual design matrix with rank(C) + p ≤ n and let Σ be a positive-definite p×p matrix. Then

$$X=ABC+\Sigma^{1/2}E$$

defines the growth curve model, where A and C are known, B and Σ are unknown, and E is a random matrix distributed as N_{p,n}(0,I_{p},_{n}).

This differs from standard MANOVA by the addition of C, a "postmatrix".

== History ==
Many writers have considered the growth curve analysis, among them Wishart (1938), Box (1950) and Rao (1958). Potthoff and Roy in 1964; were the first in analyzing longitudinal data applying GMANOVA models.

== Applications ==
GMANOVA is frequently used for the analysis of surveys, clinical trials, and agricultural data, as well as more recently in the context of Radar adaptive detection.

== Other uses ==
In mathematical statistics, growth curves such as those used in biology are often modeled as being continuous stochastic processes, e.g. as being sample paths that almost surely solve stochastic differential equations. Growth curves have been also applied in forecasting market development. When variables are measured with error, a Latent growth modeling SEM can be used.
