= Sigmoid function =

Mathematical function having a characteristic S-shaped curve or sigmoid curve

The logistic curve

Plot of the error function

A sigmoid function is any mathematical function whose graph has a characteristic S-shaped or sigmoid curve.

A common example of a sigmoid function is the logistic function.

Other sigmoid functions are given in the Examples section. In some fields, most notably in the context of artificial neural networks, the term "sigmoid function" is used as a synonym for "logistic function".

Special cases of sigmoid functions include the Gompertz curve (used in modeling systems that saturate at large values of x) and the ogee curve (used in the spillway of some dams). Sigmoid functions have domain of all real numbers, with return (response) value commonly monotonically increasing but could be decreasing. Sigmoid functions most often show a return value (y axis) in the range 0 to 1. Another commonly used range is from −1 to 1.

There is also the Heaviside step function, which instantaneously transitions between 0 and 1.

A wide variety of sigmoid functions including the logistic and hyperbolic tangent functions have been used as the activation function of artificial neurons. Sigmoid curves are also common in statistics as cumulative distribution functions (which go from 0 to 1), such as the integrals of the logistic density, the normal density, and Student's t probability density functions. The logistic sigmoid function is invertible, and its inverse is the logit function.

== Theory ==
In mathematics, a unitary sigmoid function is a bounded sigmoid-type function normalized to the unit range, typically with lower and upper asymptotes at 0 and 1. The theory proposed by Grebenc distinguishes three kinds of unitary sigmoid functions according to their asymptotic behavior and the presence or absence of oscillation near the asymptotes.

A general form of a unitary sigmoid function is

$$y = A \, S(f(x)) + B,$$

where $S$ is an increasing sigmoid function, $f(x)$ is a transformation of the independent variable, and $A$ and $B$ are constants controlling scaling and translation.

=== Classification ===
==== 1^{st} kind ====
A unitary sigmoid function of the first kind is a bounded increasing function that approaches its lower and upper asymptotes monotonically, without oscillation. This class includes many of the standard sigmoid functions used in statistics, biomathematics, and engineering, such as the logistic function and related generalizations.

==== 2^{nd} kind ====
A unitary sigmoid function of the second kind is a bounded increasing function that oscillates near the upper asymptote while preserving an overall sigmoid transition.

==== 3^{rd} kind ====
A unitary sigmoid function of the third kind is a bounded increasing function that oscillates near both the lower and upper asymptotes. These functions retain the global shape of a sigmoid curve but exhibit oscillatory behavior in the vicinity of both limiting states.

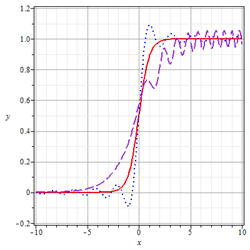
Fig. 1. Graphical representation of the three kinds of sigmoid functions on the infinite domain: the 1^{st} kind (red solid line), the 2^{nd} kind (violet dashed line), the 3^{rd} kind (blue dotted line).

=== Taxonomy ===
The tables below show the taxonomy of unitary sigmoid functions of all three kinds.

Table 1. Taxonomy matrix with examples of sigmoid functions of the 1^{st} kind

No	Type of sigmoid function	Unbounded interval $x \in (-\infty, +\infty)$	Semi-bounded interval $x \in [0, +\infty),\ a > 1,\ a \notin 2n,\ b > 0$	Unitary interval $x \in (0,1),\ a,b > 0$
1	rational	$\frac{1}{2}\left(1 + \frac{x}{|a| + |x|}\right)$ (Elliot)	$\left(1 + (b\,x)^{-a}\right)^{-c}$	$\frac{1}{2}\left(1 + \frac{(b + \frac{1}{0-x} + \frac{1}{1-x})}{\left|a\right| + \left|b + \frac{1}{0-x} + \frac{1}{1-x}\right|}\right)$
2	irrational	$\frac{1}{2}\left(1 + \frac{x}{\sqrt{a^2 + x^2}}\right)$ (algebraic) $\sqrt[-b]{1 + e^{-b\,a\,x}}$ (Richards)	$\frac{x^a}{\sqrt{b^2 + x^{2a}}}$	$\left(1 - \left(1 - x^a\right)^b\right)^c$
3	exponential	$\left(1 + e^{-a\,x}\right)^{-1}$ (Logistic/Verhulst) $\frac{1}{2} + \frac{x}{2|x|}\left(1 - e^{-a|x|}\right)$ (Laplace)	$2^{-b^{-x^a}}$; $1 - e^{-a\,x^2}$ (Rayleigh)	$\left(1 + e^{\frac{-a\,(2x^b - 1)}{x^b(1 - x^b)}}\right)^{-1}$
4	logarithmic	$\ln\!\left(\frac{1 + e^{ax} e^{\frac{1}{2}}}{1 + e^{ax} e^{-\frac{1}{2}}}\right)$	$\ln\!\left(\frac{1 + x^a e^{\frac{1}{2}}}{1 + x^a e^{-\frac{1}{2}}}\right)$	$\ln\!\left(\frac{1 + e^{\frac{a(2x^b-1)}{x^b(1-x^b)}} e^{\frac{1}{2}}}{1 + e^{\frac{a(2x^b-1)}{x^b(1-x^b)}} e^{-\frac{1}{2}}}\right)$
5	trigonometric	$\sin\!\left(\frac{\pi}{2 + 2\,e^{-a\,x}}\right)$	$\sin\!\left(\frac{\pi\,e^{a\ln (x)}}{2 + 2\,e^{a\ln (x)}}\right)$	$\frac{1}{2}\left(1 - \cos(\pi\,x)\right)$
6	inverse trigonometric	$\frac{1}{2} + \frac{1}{\pi}\arctan(a\,x)$ (Lorenz)	$\frac{1}{2} + \frac{1}{\pi}\arctan(x^a)$	$\frac{1}{2} + \frac{1}{\pi}\arctan\!\left(\frac{a(2x^b-1)}{x^b(1-x^b)}\right)$
7	hyperbolic	$\frac{1}{2} + \frac{1}{2}\tanh(a\,x)$	$\frac{1}{2} + \frac{1}{2}\tanh(a\ln (x))$ (Log-logistic)	$\frac{1}{2} + \frac{1}{2}\tanh\!\left(\frac{a(2x^b-1)}{x^b(1-x^b)}\right)$
8	inverse hyperbolic	$\frac{2}{\pi}\arcsin\!\left(\frac{1}{1 + e^{-a(x-c)}}\right),\ e^c = \sqrt{2}-1$	$\frac{2}{\pi}\arcsin\!\left(\frac{x^a}{1 + x^a}\right)$	$\frac{2}{\pi}\arcsin\!\left(\frac{1}{1 + e^{a\cot(\pi x)}}\right)$
9	special	$\frac{1}{2} + \frac{1}{2}\,\operatorname{erf}\!\left(\frac{a}{\sqrt{2}}\,x\right)$ (Normal)	$\frac{1}{2} + \frac{1}{2}\,\operatorname{erf}\!\left(\frac{a}{\sqrt{2}}\ln (x)\right)$ (Log-normal)	$\frac{1}{2} + \frac{1}{2}\,\operatorname{erf}\!\left(\frac{a(2x^b-1)}{x^b(1-x^b)}\right)$
10	stochastic	—	$e^{\left(a - \frac{b^2}{2}\right)x + b\,w_i} \cdot \left(y_0^{-1} + a\int_0^x e^{\left(a - \frac{b^2}{2}\right)s + b\,w_s} ds\right)^{-1}$	—
11	chaotic	$\frac{dx}{dt} = -x + yz,\quad \frac{dy}{dt} = -ay + az,\quad \frac{dz}{dt} = -z + by - (b-1)xy$ (Grebenc)	—	—

Table 2. Taxonomy matrix with examples of sigmoid functions of the 2^{nd} kind on the unbounded interval

No	Type of sigmoid function	Unbounded interval $x \in (-\infty, +\infty),\ A < 1,\ b > 0,\ A + B = 1$	Explanation
1	All functions from Table 1	$s(a\,x) + A \cdot \operatorname{Ai}(-b\,x)$	Adding $A \cdot \operatorname{Ai}(-bx)$ to the functions $s(ax)$ of the 3^{rd} column of the Table 1, where $\operatorname{Ai}$ is the Airy Ai function
2	special	$a\int \operatorname{Ai}(-a\,x)\,dx + \tfrac{1}{3}$	
3	special	$A\,s(a\,x) + \frac{B}{8}\left(1 + 2\,C(a\,x)\right)^2 + \frac{B}{8}\left(1 + 2\,S(a\,x)\right)^2$	$C$, $S$ are Fresnel integrals
4	special	$1 - \frac{\sin(b\,e^{a\,x})}{b\,e^{a\,x}}$	
5	special	$1 - J_0\!\left(b\,e^{a\,x}\right)$	$J_0$ is a Bessel J function

Table 3. Taxonomy matrix with examples of sigmoid functions of the 3^{rd} kind

No	Type	Unbounded interval $x \in (-\infty, +\infty),\ A + B = 1,\ B \neq 0$	Explanation
1	special	$A\,s(a\,x) + B\!\left(\tfrac{1}{2} + \frac{\operatorname{Si}(ax)}{\pi}\right)$	Adding $B\!\left(\frac{1}{2} + \frac{\operatorname{Si}(ax)}{\pi}\right)$ to the functions $A\,s(ax)$ of the 3^{rd} column of the Table 1, where $\operatorname{Si}$ is the sine integral function
2	special	$A\,s(a\,x) + B\!\left(\tfrac{1}{2} + \tfrac{1}{2}e^{\operatorname{Ci}(ax)}\right)$	Adding $B\!\left(\frac{1}{2} + \frac{e^{\operatorname{Ci}(ax)}}{2}\right)$ to the functions $A\,s(ax)$ of the 3^{rd} column of Table 1, where $\operatorname{Ci}$ is the cosine integral function
3	special	$A\,s(a\,x) + B\!\left(\tfrac{1}{2} + S(a\,x)\right)$	$S(ax)$ is the Fresnel S integral
4	special	$A\,s(a\,x) + B\!\left(\tfrac{1}{2} + C(a\,x)\right)$	$C(ax)$ is the Fresnel C integral

=== Construction methods ===
The same theory presents a list of 30 methods for constructing sigmoid functions.. These include algebraic transformations, integration and convolution methods, constructions from bell-shaped functions, solutions of ordinary and partial differential equations, recursive schemes, stochastic differential equations, feedback systems, and chaotic systems.

- M0: Construction method for sigmoid functions not evident or intuitive
- M1: Inverse of singularity functions
- M2: Sigmoid functions of embedded positive functions
- M3: Rising a sigmoid function to the power
- M4: Exponentiating a sigmoid function
- M5: Symmetric sigmoid functions derived from asymmetric ones
- M6: Sigmoid functions of the reciprocal independent variable
- M7: Embedding a sigmoid function into other function
- M8: Sum of sigmoid functions
- M9: Multiplication of sigmoid functions
- M10: Integral of the product of an increasing and a decreasing function
- M11: Derivation from lambda (bell-shaped) functions
- M12: Integration of lambda (bell-shaped) function
- M13: Integration of the sum of lambda (bell-shaped) functions
- M14: Integration of the product of two lambda (bell-shaped) functions
- M15: Integration of the difference of two shifted sigmoid functions
- M16: Integration of the product of two shifted sigmoid functions
- M17: Convolution of sigmoid functions
- M18: Integration of the product of lambda and sigmoid function
- M19: Solutions of ordinary differential equations
- M20: Solutions of partial differential equation (PDE)
- M21: Solutions of functional differential equation (FDE)
- M22: Sum of a sigmoid function and some derivatives
- M23: Combination of sigmoid functions, its derivative and integral
- M24: Filtering sigmoid functions
- M25: Special cases of Gauss hypergeometric functions
- M26: Feedback closed-loop systems
- M27: Recursive functions
- M28: Recursive time-delayed feed-forward loops
- M29: Solutions of stochastic differential equation
- M30: Chaotic sigmoid functions

Consult reference for more details.

== Definition ==
A sigmoid function is a bounded, differentiable, real function that is defined for all real input values and has a positive derivative at each point.

== Properties ==
In general, a sigmoid function is monotonic, and has a first derivative which is bell shaped. Conversely, the integral of any continuous, non-negative, bell-shaped function (with one local maximum and no local minimum, unless degenerate) will be sigmoidal. Thus the cumulative distribution functions for many common probability distributions are sigmoidal. One such example is the error function, which is related to the cumulative distribution function of a normal distribution; another is the arctan function, which is related to the cumulative distribution function of a Cauchy distribution.

A sigmoid function is constrained by a pair of horizontal asymptotes as $x \rightarrow \pm \infty$.

A sigmoid function is convex for values less than a particular point, and it is concave for values greater than that point: in many of the examples here, that point is 0.

== Examples ==
Some sigmoid functions compared. In the drawing all functions are normalized in such a way that their slope at the origin is 1.

- Logistic function
  $$f(x) = \frac{1}{1 + e^{-x}}$$
- Hyperbolic tangent (shifted and scaled version of the logistic function, above)
  $$f(x) = \tanh x = \frac{e^x-e^{-x}}{e^x+e^{-x}}$$
- Arctangent function
  $$f(x) = \arctan x$$
- Gudermannian function
  $$f(x) = \operatorname{gd}(x) = \int_0^x \frac{dt}{\cosh t} = 2\arctan\left(\tanh\left(\frac{x}{2}\right)\right)$$
- Error function
  $$f(x) = \operatorname{erf}(x) = \frac{2}{\sqrt{\pi}} \int_0^x e^{-t^2} \, dt$$
- Generalised logistic function
  $$f(x) = \left(1 + e^{-x} \right)^{-\alpha}, \quad \alpha > 0$$
- Smoothstep function
  $$f(x) = \begin{cases}
{\displaystyle
\left( \int_0^1 \left(1 - u^2\right)^N du \right)^{-1} \int_0^x \left( 1 - u^2 \right)^N \ du}, & |x| \le 1 \\
\\
\sgn(x) & |x| \ge 1 \\
\end{cases}  \quad N \in \mathbb{Z} \ge 1$$
- Some algebraic functions, for example
  $$f(x) = \frac{x}{\sqrt{1+x^2}}$$
- and in a more general form
  $$f(x) = \frac{x}{\left(1 + |x|^{k}\right)^{1/k}}$$
- Up to shifts and scaling, many sigmoids are special cases of
  $$f(x) = \varphi(\varphi(x, \beta), \alpha) ,$$
  where
  $$\varphi(x, \lambda) = \begin{cases} (1 - \lambda x)^{1/\lambda} & \lambda \ne 0 \\e^{-x} & \lambda = 0 \\  \end{cases}$$
  is the inverse of the negative Box–Cox transformation, and $\alpha < 1$ and $\beta < 1$ are shape parameters.
- Smooth transition function normalized to (−1,1):

$$\begin{align}f(x) &= \begin{cases}
{\displaystyle
\frac{2}{1+e^{-2m\frac{x}{1-x^2}}} - 1}, & |x| < 1 \\
\\
\sgn(x) & |x| \ge 1 \\
\end{cases} \\
&= \begin{cases}
{\displaystyle
\tanh\left(m\frac{x}{1-x^2}\right)}, & |x| < 1 \\
\\
\sgn(x) & |x| \ge 1 \\
\end{cases}\end{align}$$
using the hyperbolic tangent mentioned above. Here, $m$ is a free parameter encoding the slope at $x=0$, which must be greater than or equal to $\sqrt{3}$ because any smaller value will result in a function with multiple inflection points, which is therefore not a true sigmoid. This function is unusual because it actually attains the limiting values of −1 and 1 within a finite range, meaning that its value is constant at −1 for all $x \leq -1$ and at 1 for all $x \geq 1$. Nonetheless, it is smooth (infinitely differentiable, $C^\infty$) everywhere, including at $x = \pm 1$.

== Applications ==
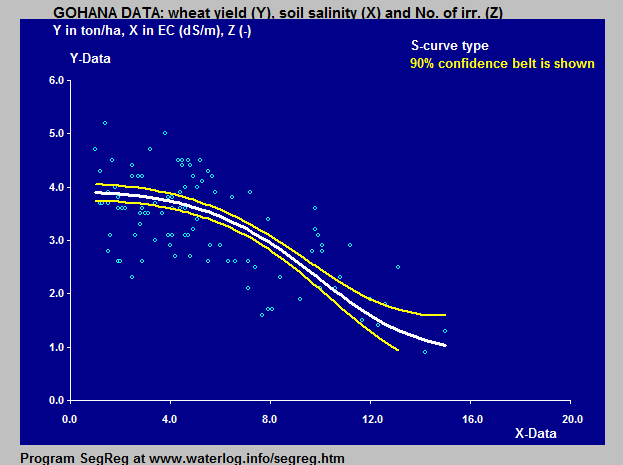
Inverted logistic S-curve to model the relation between wheat yield and soil salinity

Many natural processes, such as those of complex systems learning curves, exhibit a progression from small beginnings that accelerates and approaches a climax over time. When a specific mathematical model is lacking, a sigmoid function is often used.

The van Genuchten–Gupta model is based on an inverted S-curve and applied to the response of crop yield to soil salinity.

Examples of the application of the logistic S-curve to the response of crop yield (wheat) to both the soil salinity and depth to water table in the soil are shown in modeling crop response in agriculture.

In artificial neural networks, non-smooth functions are sometimes used for efficiency; these are known as hard sigmoids.

In audio signal processing, sigmoid functions are used as waveshaper transfer functions to emulate the sound of analog circuitry clipping.

In Digital signal processing in general, sigmoid functions, due to their higher order of continuity, have much faster asymptotic rolloff in the frequency domain than a Heavyside step function, and therefore are useful to smooth discontinuities before sampling to reduce aliasing. This is, for example, used to generate square waves in many kinds of Digital synthesizer.

In biochemistry and pharmacology, the Hill and Hill–Langmuir equations are sigmoid functions.

In driving, changing lanes is accomplished smoothly by following a sigmoid trajectory.

In computer graphics and real-time rendering, sigmoid functions are used to blend colors or geometry between two values, producing smooth transitions without visible seams or discontinuities.

Titration curves between strong acids and strong bases have a sigmoid shape due to the logarithmic nature of the pH scale.

The logistic function can be calculated efficiently by utilizing type III Unums.

A hierarchy of sigmoid growth models with increasing complexity (number of parameters) was built with the primary goal to re-analyze kinetic data, the so-called N-t curves, from heterogeneous nucleation experiments, in electrochemistry. The hierarchy includes at present three models, with 1, 2, and 3 parameters, if not counting the maximal number of nuclei N_{max}, respectively—a tanh^{2} based model called α_{21} originally devised to describe diffusion-limited crystal growth (not aggregation!) in 2D, the Johnson–Mehl–Avrami–Kolmogorov (JMAK) model, and the Richards model. It was shown that for the concrete purpose, even the simplest model works, and thus it was implied that the experiments revisited are an example of two-step nucleation with the first step being the growth of the metastable phase in which the nuclei of the stable phase form.

== See also ==
- Step function – Linear combination of indicator functions of real intervals
- Sign function – Function returning minus 1, zero or plus 1
- Heaviside step function – Indicator function of positive numbers
- Logistic regression – Statistical model for a binary dependent variable
- Logit – Function in statistics
- Softplus function – Smoothed ramp function
- Softmax function – Smooth approximation of one-hot arg max
- Swish function – Mathematical activation function in data analysis
- Weibull distribution – Continuous probability distribution
- Fermi–Dirac statistics – Statistical description for the behavior of fermions
