= Mixed inhibition =

Type of enzyme inhibition

a possible mechanism of non-competitive inhibition, a kind of mixed inhibition.

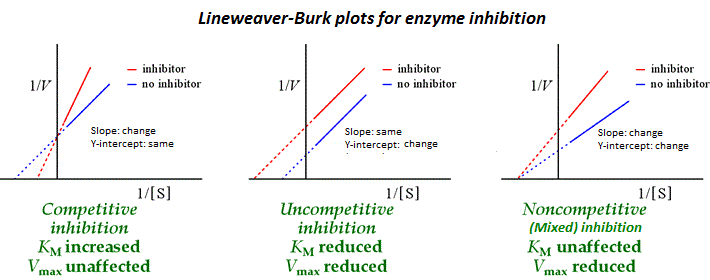

Mixed inhibition is a type of enzyme inhibition in which the inhibitor may bind to the enzyme whether or not the enzyme has already bound the substrate but has a greater affinity for one state or the other. It is called "mixed" because it can be seen as a conceptual "mixture" of competitive inhibition, in which the inhibitor can only bind the enzyme if the substrate has not already bound, and uncompetitive inhibition, in which the inhibitor can only bind the enzyme if the substrate has already bound. If the ability of the inhibitor to bind the enzyme is exactly the same whether or not the enzyme has already bound the substrate, it is known as a non-competitive inhibitor. Non-competitive inhibition is sometimes thought of as a special case of mixed inhibition.

In mixed inhibition, the inhibitor binds to an allosteric site, i.e. a site different from the active site where the substrate binds. However, not all inhibitors that bind at allosteric sites are mixed inhibitors.

Mixed inhibition may result in either:

- A decrease in the apparent affinity of the enzyme for the substrate (Km value appears to increase; $K_m^\text{app} > K_m$) -- seen in cases where the inhibitor favours binding to the free enzyme. More closely mimics competitive binding.
- An increase in the apparent affinity of the enzyme for the substrate (Km value appears to decrease; $K_m^\text{app} < K_m$) -- seen in cases where the inhibitor favours binding to the enzyme-substrate complex. More closely mimics uncompetitive binding.

In either case the inhibition decreases the apparent maximum enzyme reaction rate ($V_{max}^\text{app} < V_{max}$).

Mathematically, mixed inhibition occurs when the factors α and α' (introduced into the Michaelis-Menten equation to account for competitive and uncompetitive inhibition, respectively) are both greater than 1.

In the special case where α = α', noncompetitive inhibition occurs, in which case $V_{max}^{app}$ is reduced but $K_m$ is unaffected. This is very unusual in practice.

== Biological examples ==
In gluconeogenesis, the enzyme cPEPCK (cytosolic phosphoenolpyruvate carboxykinase) is responsible for converting oxaloacetate into phosphoenolpyruvic acid, or PEP, when guanosine triphosphate, GTP, is present. This step is exclusive for gluconeogenesis, which occurs under fasting condition's due to the body's depletion of glucose. cPEPCK is known to be regulated by Genistein, an isoflavone that is naturally found in a number of plants. It was first proven that genistein inhibits the activity of cPEPCK. In a study, the presence of this isoflavone resulted in a decrease in the level of blood sugar. A lowered blood sugar level means less glucose is in the blood. If this occurs in a subject that is fasting, this is because the gluconeogenesis was inhibited, preventing increased production of glucose. The ability of genistein to lower a person's blood sugar level allows it to be referred to as an anti-diabetic property. The mechanism in which genistein inhibited the enzyme cPEPCK was further evaluated. First, cPEPCK was placed in the presence of 3-Mercaptopropionic acid, or 3-MPA, a known inhibitor of the enzyme. It was compared to the results of placing cPEPCK in the presence of genistein, which revealed that the mechanism of mixed inhibition was used to decrease cPEPCK's activity. cPEPCK undergoes multiple configurations when catalyzing the formation of PEP. It can be either unbound, bound to GDP or bound to GTP. An experiment that studied the affinity for genistein in these different configurations was conducted. It revealed that geinstein favors binding to the cPEPCK with a bound GTP than then the enzyme with a bound GDP, which was found to be less stable. This was because the GTP-bound cPEPCK revealed an extended binding site for genistein. This is the same binding site as the enzyme's intended substrate, oxaloacetate while the other configurations did not do so in the presence of genistein. This provided evidence that the mechanism of inhibition of cPEPCK by genistein was a mixture of competitive and non-competitive inhibition.

A kallikrein is a type of serine protease, which cleaves peptide bonds after certain amino acids in a protein. These 15 kallikreins, KLK1 to KLK15, are found in human tissues. The ability for this molecule to cleave proteins results in the effective activation of cell surface receptors, making them crucial elements of many biological signal transduction pathways, and its amplification through cascades. This family of serine proteases is often a biomarker to diseases, and therefore, have become a target for inhibition. Inhibition of these kallikreins results in possible therapy for diseases such as metastatic cancer or Alzheimer's disease. Fukugetin, or (+)-morelloflavone, is a type of plant biflavonoid isolated from Garcinia brasiliensis. After isolating fukugetin, it was placed with KLK1, KLK2, KLK3, KLK4, KLK5, KLK6, and KLK7 in varying concentrations. This allowed for the analysis of enzyme kinetics through derivation of parameters Km and Vmax. Through the model of Michaelis-Menten kinetics, the Eadie-Hofstee diagram was plotted. It confirmed that fukugetin acts as a mixed inhibitor by exhibiting varying but present affinities for the enzyme alone and the enzyme-substrate complex. Analyzing through kinetics, fukugetin decreased the Vmax while it increased the Km for these KLKs. Typically, in competitive inhibition, Vmax remains the same while Km increases, and in uncompetitive inhibition, Vmax decreases while Km remains the same. The change in both of these variables is another finding consistent with the effects of a mixed inhibitor.
