= Sunflower trypsin inhibitor =

Sunflower trypsin inhibitor (SFTI) is a small, circular peptide produced in sunflower seeds, and is a potent inhibitor of trypsin. It is the smallest known member of the Bowman-Birk family of serine protease inhibitors.

One example of Sunflower trypsin inhibitor is Sunflower trypsin inhibitor-1 (SFTI-1). Sunflower trypsin inhibitor-1 is a potent Bowman-Birk inhibitor. Sunflower trypsin inhibitor-1 is the simplest cysteine-rich peptide scaffold because it is a bicyclic 14 amino acid peptide and only has one disulfide bond. The disulfide bond divides the peptide into a primary trypsin inhibitory loop (Thr4-Ile10) and a cyclisation loop (Phe12-Arg2). The cyclisation loop can be replaced by a foregin bioactive loop without disrupting the scaffold's fold. It is extracted from a seed of a sunflower called Helianthus annuus. The synthesis of SFTI is not known however, it can evolutionarily linked to a gene-coded product from classic Bowman-Birk inhibitors. STFI is used in radiopharmaceutical, antimicrobial, and pro-angiogenic peptides.

== Synthetic inhibitors and the structure of SFTI ==
By modifying the amino acid sequence of sunflower trypsin inhibitor, more specifically, sunflower trypsin inhibitor-1 (SFTI-1), researchers have been able to develop synthetic serine protease inhibitors that have specificity and improved inhibitory activity towards certain serine proteases that are found in the human body, such as tissue kallikreins and human matriptase-1. For instance, researchers from the Institute of Child Health and the Department of Chemistry of the University College London, have created two SFTI-1 analogs (I10G and I10H) by substituting residue 10 of SFTI-1 (isoleucine, I) with glycine (G) and histidine (H), respectively. Out of the two analogs, SFTI-I10H was found to be the more potent KLK5 inhibitor. Another group of researchers from the previously mentioned institute and department of the University College London, conducted further research on the development of synthetic kallikrein inhibitors by modifying the amino acid sequence of SFTI-I10H. Out of the six SFTI-I10H variants that were constructed by modifying SFTI-I10H, the first and second variant (K5R_I10H and I10H_F12W) demonstrated improved KLK5 inhibition and the sixth variant (K5R_I10H_F12W) showed dual-inhibition of KLK5 and KLK7, improved KLK5 inhibition potency, and specificity for KLK5 and KLK14. The first variant (K5R_I10H) was made by replacing residue 5 of SFTI-I10H (lysine, K) with arginine (R), and in order to get the second variant (I10H_F12W) residue 12 (phenylalanine, F) was replaced with tryptophan (W). Lastly, the sixth variant (K5R_I10H_F12W) was developed by combining the amino acid substitutions of the first and second variants.

Moreover, researchers from the Clemens-Schöpf Institute of Organic Chemistry and Biochemistry and Helmholtz-Institute for Pharmaceutical Research Saarland, developed potent synthetic human matriptase-1 inhibitors based on a different SFTI-1 variant, SDMI-1. SFTI-1 derived matriptase inhibitor-1 (SDMI-1) was previously developed by replacing residue 10 of SFTI-1 (isoleucine, I) with arginine (R) and residue 12 (phenylalanine, F) with histidine (H). Further modifications of SDMI-1 resulted in synthetic matriptase-1 inhibitors with improved inhibitory activity, matriptase binding, and inhibition potency. The SDMI-1 variant that resulted in enhanced inhibitory activity was developed by replacing residue 1 of SDMI-1 (glycine, G) with lysine (K) and by keeping it as a monocyclic structure. The SDMI-1 variant that resulted in improved matriptase binding was created by using the same amino acid substitutions of the previously mentioned SDMI-1 variant and by attaching a bulky fluorescein moiety to the side chain of lysine. Lastly, the SDMI-1 variant that had enhanced inhibition potency was developed by applying the same amino acid substitutions of the previous variants, cleaving the proline-aspartic acid sequence found at the C-terminus (PD-OH), and by making it a bicyclic compound via tail-to-side-chain cyclization.

== See also ==
- Bowman-Birk protease inhibitor
