= Renal tissue kallikrein =

Class of enzymes

Tissue kallikrein

Identifiers
- EC no.: 3.4.21.35
- CAS no.: 389069-73-2

Databases
- BRENDA: enzyme data
- ExPASy: NiceZyme view
- KEGG: enzyme entry
- MetaCyc: metabolic pathway
- Rhea: reactions
- PDB structures: RCSB PDB PDBe PDBsum
Search
- PMC: articles
- PubMed: articles
- NCBI: proteins

Renal tissue kallikrein (EC 3.4.21.35, glandular kallikrein, pancreatic kallikrein, submandibular kallikrein, submaxillary kallikrein, kidney kallikrein, urinary kallikrein, kallikrein, salivary kallikrein, kininogenin, kininogenase, callicrein, glumorin, padreatin, padutin, kallidinogenase, bradykininogenase, depot-padutin, urokallikrein, dilminal D, onokrein P) is an enzyme.

Renal tissue kallikrein is formed from kidney tissue prokallikrein by activation with the enzyme trypsin. It catalyses the chemical reaction causing preferential cleavage of Arg- bonds in small molecule substrates, acting to highly selectively release kallidin (lysyl-bradykinin, a bioactive kinin) from kininogen (a kinin protein precursor).

In humans, there are two reported isozymes: kallikrein-1 and kallikrein-2.
