= Protease-activated receptor 2 =

Protein-coding gene in the species Homo sapiens

F2RL1

Identifiers
- Aliases: F2RL1, GPR11, PAR2, Protease activated receptor 2, F2R like trypsin receptor 1
- External IDs: OMIM: 600933; MGI: 101910; GeneCards: F2RL1

Gene location (Human)
Chr.	Chromosome 5 (human)
Band	5q13.3	Start	76,818,933 bp
Band	5q13.3	End	76,835,315 bp

Gene location (Mouse)
Chr.	Chromosome 13 (mouse)
Band	13 D1|13 49.53 cM	Start	95,648,240 bp
Band	13 D1|13 49.53 cM	End	95,661,735 bp
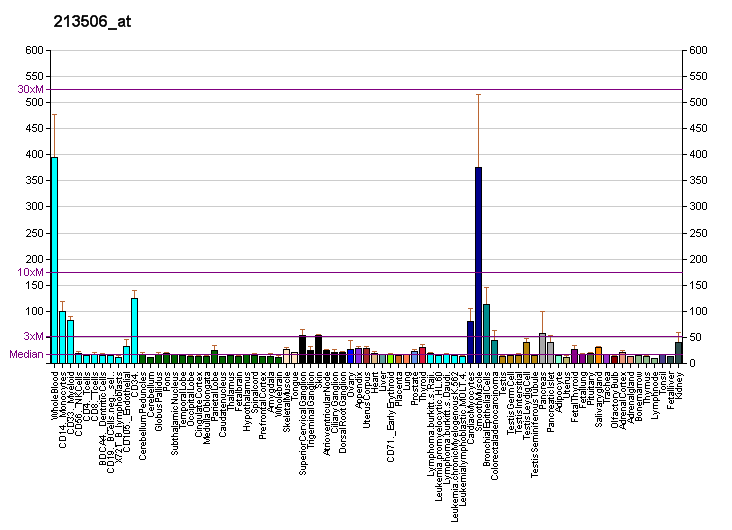

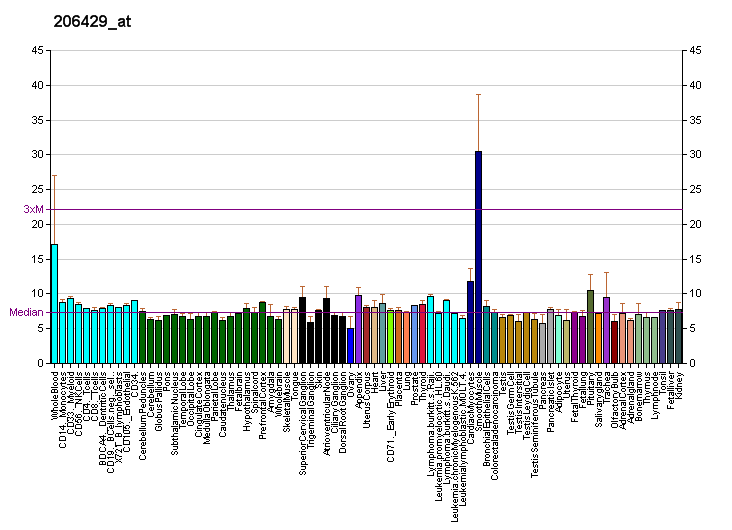
RNA expression pattern
Bgee	Human / Mouse (ortholog); Top expressed in: mucosa of sigmoid colon; jejunal mucosa; skin of thigh; duodenum; kidney tubule; rectum; skin of hip; gingival epithelium; mucosa of ileum; mucosa of transverse colon / Top expressed in: epithelium of stomach; vestibular membrane of cochlear duct; left colon; pineal gland; ileum; corneal stroma; mucous cell of stomach; pyloric antrum; jejunum; lip; More reference expression data
BioGPS	More reference expression data
Gene ontology
Molecular function	G protein-coupled receptor activity; signal transducer activity; thrombin-activated receptor activity; G-protein beta-subunit binding; protein binding; G-protein alpha-subunit binding; signaling receptor binding; signaling receptor activity
Cellular component	integral component of membrane; Golgi apparatus; pseudopodium; membrane; plasma membrane; integral component of plasma membrane; early endosome
Biological process	positive regulation of Rho protein signal transduction; establishment of endothelial barrier; thrombin-activated receptor signaling pathway; neutrophil activation; positive regulation of phagocytosis, engulfment; positive regulation of toll-like receptor 3 signaling pathway; positive regulation of eosinophil degranulation; positive regulation of neutrophil mediated killing of gram-negative bacterium; negative regulation of tumor necrosis factor-mediated signaling pathway; immune system process; positive regulation of cell migration; positive regulation of cytosolic calcium ion concentration; blood coagulation; positive regulation of JNK cascade; positive regulation of leukocyte chemotaxis; negative regulation of JNK cascade; leukocyte proliferation; regulation of JNK cascade; positive regulation of pseudopodium assembly; positive regulation of renin secretion into blood stream; defense response to virus; positive regulation of chemotaxis; positive regulation of ERK1 and ERK2 cascade; positive regulation of toll-like receptor 4 signaling pathway; positive regulation of I-kappaB kinase/NF-kappaB signaling; positive regulation of toll-like receptor 2 signaling pathway; positive regulation of phosphatidylinositol 3-kinase signaling; positive regulation of superoxide anion generation; positive regulation of glomerular filtration; regulation of blood coagulation; inflammatory response; innate immune response; mature conventional dendritic cell differentiation; negative regulation of toll-like receptor 3 signaling pathway; positive regulation of actin filament depolymerization; leukocyte migration; regulation of I-kappaB kinase/NF-kappaB signaling; positive regulation of transcription by RNA polymerase II; positive regulation of positive chemotaxis; signal transduction; T cell activation involved in immune response; positive regulation of cytosolic calcium ion concentration involved in phospholipase C-activating G protein-coupled signaling pathway; G protein-coupled receptor signaling pathway; positive regulation of GTPase activity; cell-cell junction maintenance
Sources:Amigo / QuickGO
Orthologs
Databases	NCBI: entry; OMA: entry
Species	Human	Mouse
Entrez	2150	14063
Ensembl	ENSG00000164251	ENSMUSG00000021678
UniProt	P55085	P55086
RefSeq (mRNA)	NM_005242	NM_007974
RefSeq (protein)	NP_005233	NP_032000
Location (UCSC)	Chr 5: 76.82 – 76.84 Mb	Chr 13: 95.65 – 95.66 Mb
PubMed search
- Wikidata
View/Edit Human	View/Edit Mouse

Protease activated receptor 2 (PAR2) also known as coagulation factor II (thrombin) receptor-like 1 (F2RL1) or G-protein coupled receptor 11 (GPR11) is a protein that in humans is encoded by the F2RL1 gene. PAR2 modulates inflammatory responses, obesity, metabolism, cancers and acts as a sensor for proteolytic enzymes generated during infection. In humans, we can find PAR2 in the stratum granulosum layer of epidermal keratinocytes. Functional PAR2 is also expressed by several immune cells such as eosinophils, neutrophils, monocytes, macrophages, dendritic cells, mast cells and T cells.

== Gene ==
The F2RL1 gene contains two exons and is widely expressed in human tissues. The predicted protein sequence is 83% identical to the mouse receptor sequence.

== Mechanism of activation ==
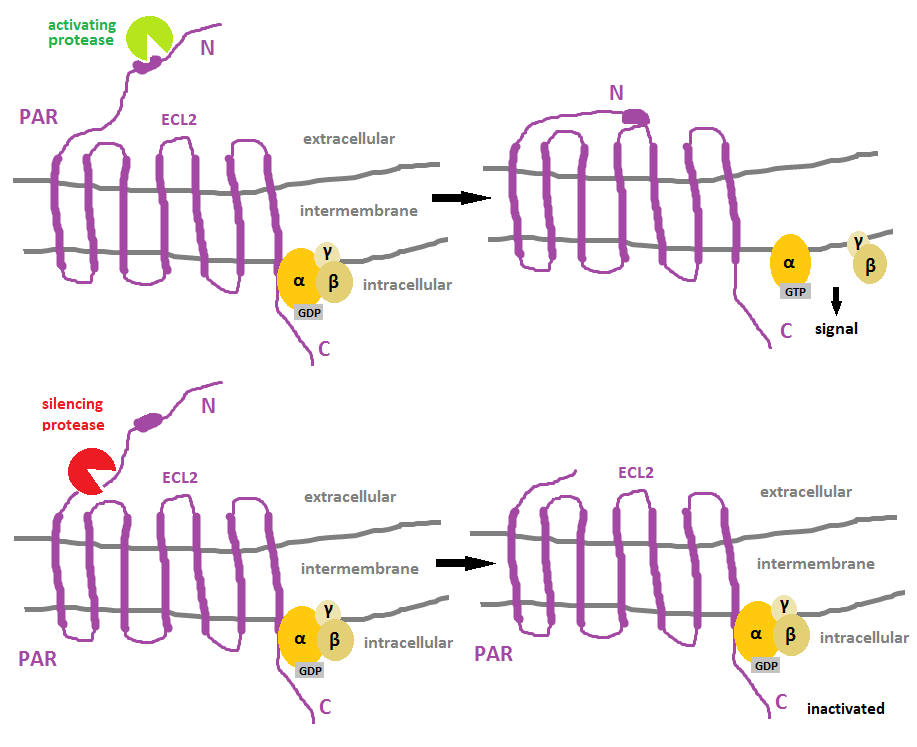
Activation vs silencing of PAR

PAR2 is a member of the large family of 7-transmembrane receptors that couple to guanosine-nucleotide-binding proteins and also belongs to the protease-activated receptor family. PAR2 is activated by several endogenous and exogenous proteases through proteolytic cleavage of its extracellular amino terminus between arginine and serine. The newly exposed N-terminus serves as tethered activation ligand that binds to a conserved region on extracellular loop 2 (ECL2), thereby activating the receptor. These receptors can also be activated non-proteolytically by exogenous peptide sequences that mimic the terminal amino acids of the tethered ligand. Alternatively, cleavage by other proteases at non-signaling sites can render the receptor unresponsive to further protease exposure. Trypsin is the major PAR2 cleaving protease that initiates inflammatory signaling. It was found that even thrombin in high concentrations is able to cleave PAR2. Another PAR2 cleaving protease is tryptase, the main protease of mast cells, which by PAR2 proteolytic cleavage induces calcium signaling and proliferation. PARs have been identified as substrates of kallikreins, which have been related to various inflammatory and tumorigenic processes. In case of PAR2, particularly speaking about kallikrein-4, -5, -6 a -14. PAR2 is known to transactivate TLR4 and epidermal growth factor receptor in diseases.

== Function ==
There are many studies dealing with elucidation of PAR2 function in different cells and tissues. In case of human airway and lung parenchyma PAR2 is responsible for increased fibroblasts proliferation and elevation of IL‐6, IL‐8, PGE2 and Ca2+ levels. In mice it participates on vasodilatation. Together with PAR1 its deregulation is also involved in processes of cancer cells migration and differentiation.

== Agonists and antagonists ==
Potent and selective small molecule agonists and antagonists for PAR2 have been discovered.

Functional selectivity occurs with PAR2, several proteases cleave PAR2 at distinct sites leading to biased signalling. Synthetic small ligands also modulate biased signalling leading to different functional responses.

So far, PAR2 has been co-crystallized with two different antagonist ligands, while an agonist-bound state model of PAR2 (with the endogenous ligand SLIGKV) has been determined through mutagenesis and structure-based drug design.

== See also ==
- Protease-activated receptor
- Protease-activated receptor 1
- Protease-activated receptor 3
