= Kallikrein-7 =

Enzyme found in humans

KLK7
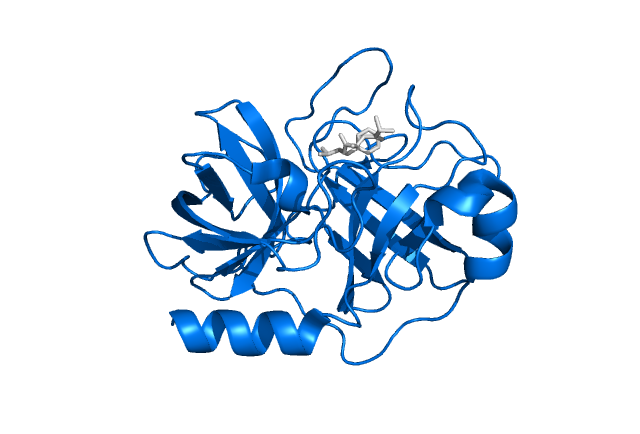

Identifiers
- Aliases: KLK7, PRSS6, SCCE, hK7, kallikrein related peptidase 7
- External IDs: OMIM: 604438; MGI: 1346336; GeneCards: KLK7
Available structures
PDB	Ortholog search: PDBe RCSB
PDB	List of PDB id codes 2QXG, 2QXH, 2QXI, 2QXJ, 3BSQ
Enzyme activity
EC #	BRENDA	ExPASy	KEGG	MetaCyc
3.4.21.117	↗	↗	↗	↗

Gene location (Human)
Chr.	Chromosome 19 (human)
Band	19q13.41	Start	50,976,468 bp
Band	19q13.41	End	50,984,099 bp

Gene location (Mouse)
Chr.	Chromosome 7 (mouse)
Band	7 B3|7 28.27 cM	Start	43,460,718 bp
Band	7 B3|7 28.27 cM	End	43,465,783 bp
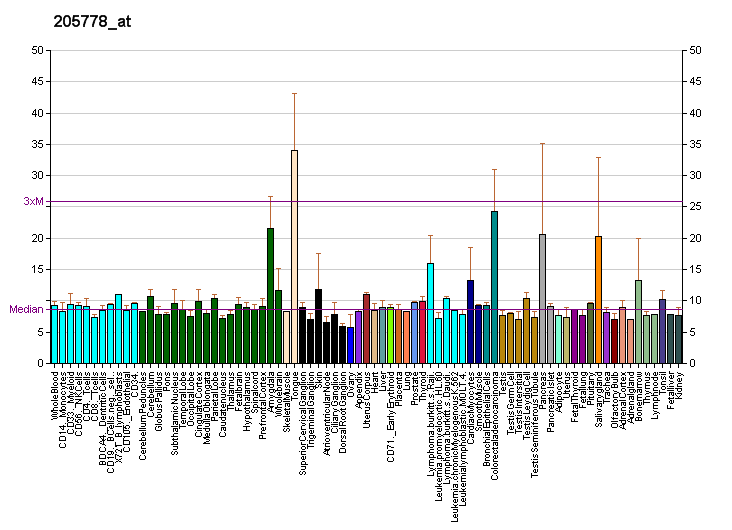
RNA expression pattern
Bgee	Human / Mouse (ortholog); Top expressed in: gingival epithelium; vulva; human penis; skin of arm; skin of thigh; skin of abdomen; nipple; skin of hip; mucosa of pharynx; body of tongue / Top expressed in: lip; skin of external ear; basilar part of occipital bone; skin of back; esophagus; sphenoid bone; decidua; umbilical cord; basisphenoid; Meckel's cartilage; More reference expression data
BioGPS	More reference expression data
Gene ontology
Molecular function	peptidase activity; serine-type peptidase activity; hydrolase activity; serine-type endopeptidase activity; metalloendopeptidase activity
Cellular component	extracellular region; epidermal lamellar body; extracellular space; secretory granule
Biological process	positive regulation of antibacterial peptide production; extracellular matrix disassembly; proteolysis; epidermis development
Sources:Amigo / QuickGO
Orthologs
Databases	NCBI: entry; OMA: entry
Species	Human	Mouse
Entrez	5650	23993
Ensembl	ENSG00000169035	ENSMUSG00000030713
UniProt	P49862; Q6DTY1	Q91VE3
RefSeq (mRNA)	NM_139277; NM_001207053; NM_001243126; NM_005046	NM_011872
RefSeq (protein)	NP_001193982; NP_001230055; NP_005037; NP_644806	NP_036002
Location (UCSC)	Chr 19: 50.98 – 50.98 Mb	Chr 7: 43.46 – 43.47 Mb
PubMed search
- Wikidata
View/Edit Human	View/Edit Mouse

Stratum corneum chymotryptic enzyme

Identifiers
- EC no.: 3.4.21.117
- CAS no.: 155215-90-0

Databases
- BRENDA: enzyme data
- ExPASy: NiceZyme view
- KEGG: enzyme entry
- MetaCyc: metabolic pathway
- Rhea: reactions
- PDB structures: RCSB PDB PDBe PDBsum
Search
- PMC: articles
- PubMed: articles
- NCBI: proteins

Kallikrein-7 (KLK7), also called stratum corneum chymotryptic enzyme (EC 3.4.21.117), is a enzyme that in humans is encoded by the KLK7 gene. This enzyme is thought to be involved in skin shedding by degrading the connections between cornified cells in the outer layer of the skin.

== Discovery ==
KLK7 was initially purified from the epidermis and characterised as stratum corneum chymotryptic enzyme (SCCE). It was later identified as the seventh member of the human kallikrein family, which includes fifteen homologous serine proteases located on chromosome 19 (19q13).

== Gene ==
Alternative splicing of the KLK7 gene results in two transcript variants encoding the same protein.

== Function ==
KLK7 is secreted as an inactive zymogen in the stratum granulosum layer of the epidermis, requiring proteolytic cleavage of the short N-terminal pro-region to liberate the activated enzyme. This may be performed by KLK5 or matriptase, which are in vitro activators of KLK7.

Once active, KLK7 is able to cleave desmocollin and corneodesmosin. These proteins constitute the extracellular component of corneodesmosomes, intercellular cohesive structures which link the intermediate filaments of adjacent cells in the stratum corneum. Proteolysis of corneodesmosomes is required for desquamation, the shedding of corneocytes from the outer layer of the epidermis. This indicates a role for KLK7 in maintaining skin homeostasis. For example, KLK7 expression is highly downregulated at acral surfaces where desquamation is delayed and the epidermis is thick.

Both KLK5 and KLK14, other skin-expressed proteases, also cleave corneodesmosomal proteins. KLK5 is able to undergo autoactivation, as well as activating KLK7 and KLK14, suggesting a KLK skin cascade is responsible for coordinating desquamation.

KLK7 activity is regulated by a number of endogenous protein inhibitors including LEKTI, SPINK6, elafin and alpha-2-Macroglobulin-like 1. Both Zn^{2+} and Cu^{2+} ions are also able to inhibit KLK7.

KLK7 is a chymotrypsin-like serine protease, preferring to cleave proteins at the residues tyrosine, phenylalanine or leucine. Analysis of peptide substrate hydrolysis indicates a strong preference for tyrosine at P1.

== Clinical significance ==
=== Skin disease ===
Dysregulation of KLK7 has been linked to several skin disorders including atopic dermatitis, psoriasis and Netherton syndrome. These diseases are characterised by excessively dry, scaly and inflamed skin, due to a disruption of skin homeostasis and correct barrier function.

=== Cancer ===
Overexpression of KLK7 may provide a route for metastasis in ovarian, breast, pancreatic, cervix, and melanoma cancers by excessive cleavage of cell junction proteins. It may also be underexpressed in lung cancer.

== Enzyme class ==
This enzyme's official enzyme class is called stratum corneum chymotryptic enzyme (EC 3.4.21.117), which currently consists of the human and mouse orthologs of KLK7. This enzyme catalyses the following chemical reaction

Cleavage of proteins with aromatic side chains in the P1 position

This enzyme has wide substrate specificity.
