= Neuropsin =

Term neuropsin may refer to:

- Kallikrein-8, an enzyme encoded by the KLK8 gene
- OPN5, a protein that in humans is encoded by the OPN5 gene
