= PAR2 =

PAR2 may refer to:

- Parchive, an error correction system for computer files. The second version is known as PAR2.
- Protease activated receptor 2, a G-protein coupled receptor protein
- PAR2, one of the pseudoautosomal regions of the X and Y chromosomes
