= MEDI0618 =

Monoclonal antibody

MEDI0618 is a proteinase-activated receptor-2 modulator developed by AstraZeneca for migraine and chronic osteoarthritis.
