= Laser-assisted drug delivery =

Transdermal drug delivery technique

Laser-assisted drug delivery (LADD) is a drug delivery technique commonly used in the dermatology field that involves lasers. As skin acts as a protective barrier to the environment, the absorption of topical products through the epidermis is limited; thus, different drug delivery modalities have been employed to improve the efficacy of these treatments. The use of lasers in LADD has been shown to enhance the penetration of drugs transdermal, leading to a higher absorption rate, limited systemic effects, and reduced duration of treatment. Although this technique has evolved in the past decade due to its efficacy through scientific research and clinical practice, there remain some limitations regarding the safety aspect that needs to be taken into consideration.

== Transdermal drug delivery ==
=== The skin barrier ===
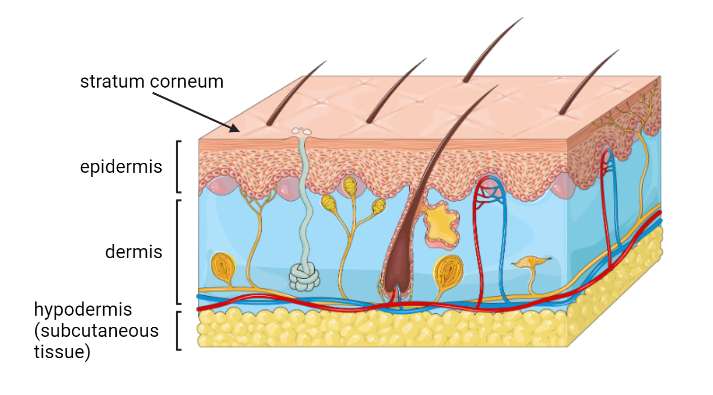
Skin anatomy

Skin is the largest organ in the human body that acts as the primary protective barrier against the external environment. It provides protection against ultraviolet light, trauma, pathogens, microorganisms, and toxins, sensory perception, temperature regulation, and immunity. There are primarily three layers of skin, which include the outer epidermis, followed by the dermis and subcutaneous tissue, or hypodermis. Skin is used as the target for drug delivery as it is a convenient route of drug administration, and the large area allows for different placements on the skin for transdermal delivery

=== Transdermal delivery ===
Transdermal delivery is a non-invasive method commonly assisted in transporting topical products into intact and healthy skin. The substances initially penetrate through the stratum corneum, which is the outermost layer of the epidermis, then diffuse into the deeper epidermis and dermis layers for a systemic effect. Although transdermal drug delivery presents several advantages as compared to other conventional modalities such as oral and parenteral routes, the complexity of the skin barrier limits the methodology to reach its full potential.

=== Improvement in transdermal delivery ===
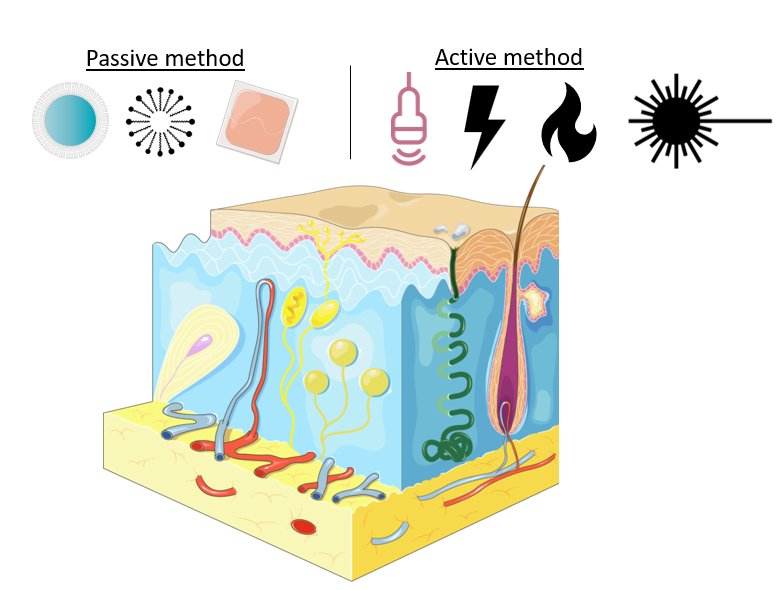
Passive and active methods for improvement of transdermal delivery

Various technologies have been developed to enhance the permeability of transdermal drugs, which can be divided into passive or chemical and active or physical methods. The passive approach involves the optimization of drug and vehicle interaction that could modify the stratum corneum structure or the addition of penetration enhancers for better absorption rates. Some of the limitations of this approach include lag time in drug release, low efficiency, and skin irritation. The active approach involves ultrasound, electrical stimulation, thermal approach, and mechanical approach. These techniques facilitate the transportation of drugs by using energy as a driving force. Within the thermal approach, laser-assisted drug delivery is a common and effective method that has been used to increase the efficiency of transdermal drug delivery by selectively destroying the chromophores of interest using light waves.

== Specifications for using LADD ==
=== Lasers ===
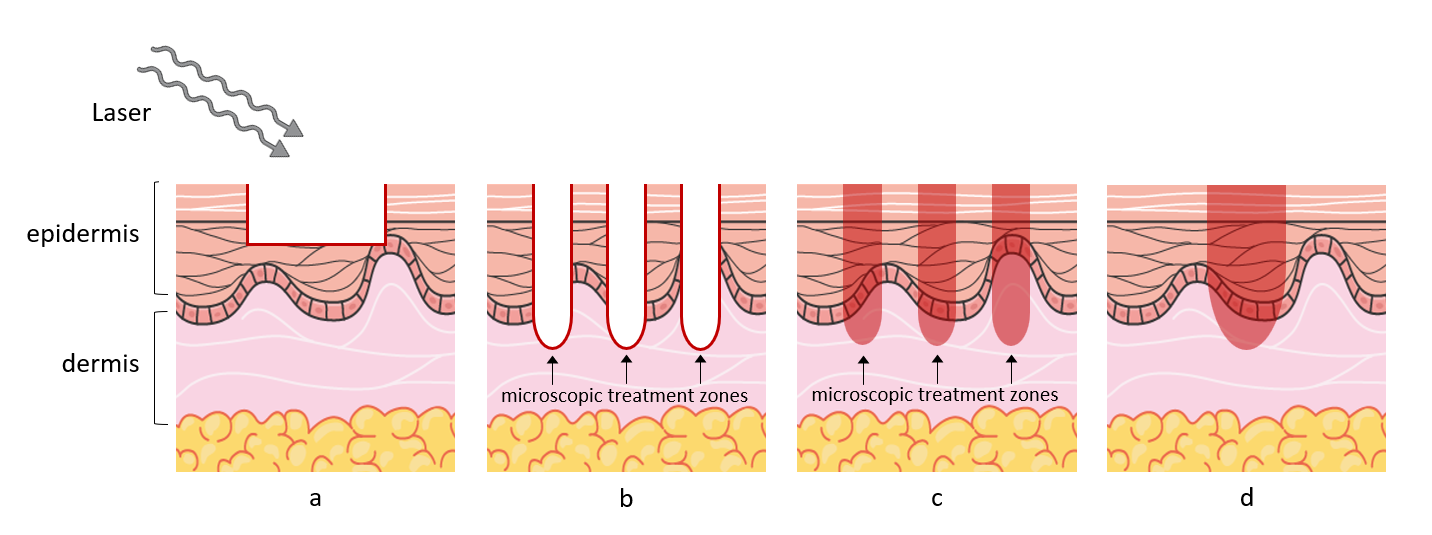
Different types of lasers used in LADD (a. fully ablative, b. ablative fractional, c. nonablative fractional, d. nonablative)

There are different types of lasers used in LADD, and they can be categorized into four main groups: (1) fully ablative lasers, (2) ablative fractional lasers (AFL), (3) non-ablative fractional lasers (NAFL), and (4) non-ablative dermal remodeling lasers. Common fully ablative lasers, including carbon dioxide (CO_{2}, wavelength peak 10,600 nm) and erbium-doped yttrium aluminum garnet (Er:YAG, wavelength peak 2940 nm), target water as their chromophore where all water-containing tissues within the epidermis are ablated. With its high wavelength peak, CO_{2} laser has a high absorption rate of water and adipose tissues; whereas the wavelength of Er:YAG allows for the precise ablation of water and minimizes heat generation. The mechanism of AFL is similar to fully ablative lasers but when used fractionally, they create multiple vertical columns on the skin surface, which are also called microscopic treatment zones (MTZ) and allow for a more quantitatively controllable usage in LADD. NAFL are also fractionated lasers that produce MTZ, but as they are non-ablative, there is no ablation of the epidermis and instead, they use light energy to damage the dermis layer. Non-ablative dermal remodeling lasers include all types of lasers with a chromophore that is different from water as used in the previous groups. Common lasers within this group are neodymium-doped YAG laser (Nd: YAG, wavelength peak 1064 nm and 1320 nm), pulsed dye laser (wavelength ranges from 585 to 600 nm), and intense pulsed laser (IPL, wavelength ranges from 500 to 1200 nm). In general, with its high efficiency and rapid recovery time, AFL is the more common modality used for LADD, especially in the dermatology field.

=== Drugs ===
Lipophilic substances have shown to have a greater ability to cross the epidermis, thus, the efficiency of LADD is more remarkable when using hydrophilic substances. Liquid and gel formulations of drugs also are proven to cross the channels created from the fractional lasers more easily as compared to oily formulations such as creams or ointments. Common drugs used in LAPP include but are not limited to 5-aminolaevulinic (5-ALA), 5-aminolevulinate (MAL), methotrexate (MTX), imiquimod, 5-fluorouracil (5-FU), timolol, triamcinolone acetonide (TAC), bimatoprost, tretinoin, pimecrolimus, poly-L-lactic acid (PLLA), analgesics, minoxidil (MXD), diphencyprone (DPCP), vitamin C, small interfering RNA (siRNA), vaccine, and antibodies.

=== Patients ===
The efficiency of LADD with the selected laser settings is dependent upon the different characteristics associated with individual patients. The dermatological condition, the properties of the skin, and the surface area are taken into consideration to determine the eligibility of the patients for certain lasers and provide optimal treatments for each patient. For example, hydrated skin has a higher affinity for absorption of oily substances; skin atrophy that is associated with solar elastosis is more likely to produce pathological scarring under high laser intensity; hair areas have a higher absorption rate; older patients are more prone to adverse effects such as atrophy, erosion, ulceration, and will require longer recovery time. Not all patients are candidates for LADD as this method is intensified as compared to conventional topical treatment.

== Pre-clinical application ==
A vast majority of pre-clinical work on LADD focuses on AFL based on its translational characteristics in clinical settings. These studies utilized mostly either porcine or murine skin as their disease model.

=== Porcine skin ===
Within the dermatology field, porcine skin has been used as a disease model for testing the efficacy of LADD in vivo. Haedersdal et al. pre-treated porcine skin with CO_{2}-AFL before the application of MAL photodynamic therapy (PDT), creating single MTZs that increased porphyrin fluorescence uniformly up to 1.5 mm from the ablated channels. This demonstrated that for MAL, pre-treatment of AFL with MTZs spacing at 3-mm intervals, covering less than 1% surface of the area, was useful for the entire lesion. Similarly, Bachhav et al. showed that the increased numbers of MTZs from Er:YAG laser did not affect the absorption of lidocaine into either the epidermis or dermis, and thus, higher fluences of laser were not proportionally correlated to the absorption rate. AFL pre-treatment of porcine skin also has shown to enhance the delivery of MAL at deeper layers of the skin, increase surface fluorescence from MAL as compared to non-AFL pre-treated skin, and induce higher fluorescence of 5-ALA as compared to MAL for deeper structure.

=== Murine skin ===
Besides porcine skin, murine skin has also been used for testing the efficacy of LADD. A study performed on murine skin has shown that the penetration of 5-FU through skin increased 36 to 133-fold after pre-treatment with fully ablative Q-switched ruby, CO_{2}, or Er:YAG lasers. Likewise, delivery of imiquimod in both murine and porcine skin increased up to 65-fold and 127-fold, after one and four passes of low-fluence fractional Er:YAG laser, respectively. As a result, with LADD, a dose of 0.4% imiquimod was equivalent to a topically applied dose of 5% imiquimod, which implied that a lower dosage of drug could be used with similar clinical outcomes. Besides topical drugs, Chen et al. showed that the treatment of fractional CO_{2} on murine skin increased 8- to 15-fold the delivery of ovalbumin vaccine, along with an enhanced production of ovalbumin specific antibodies at 2 weeks.

== Clinical application ==
LADD has been implemented in clinical practice to support the absorption of topical agents into the skin, representative drugs include 5-ALA, MAL, 5-FU, corticosteroid, vitamin, and lidocaine.

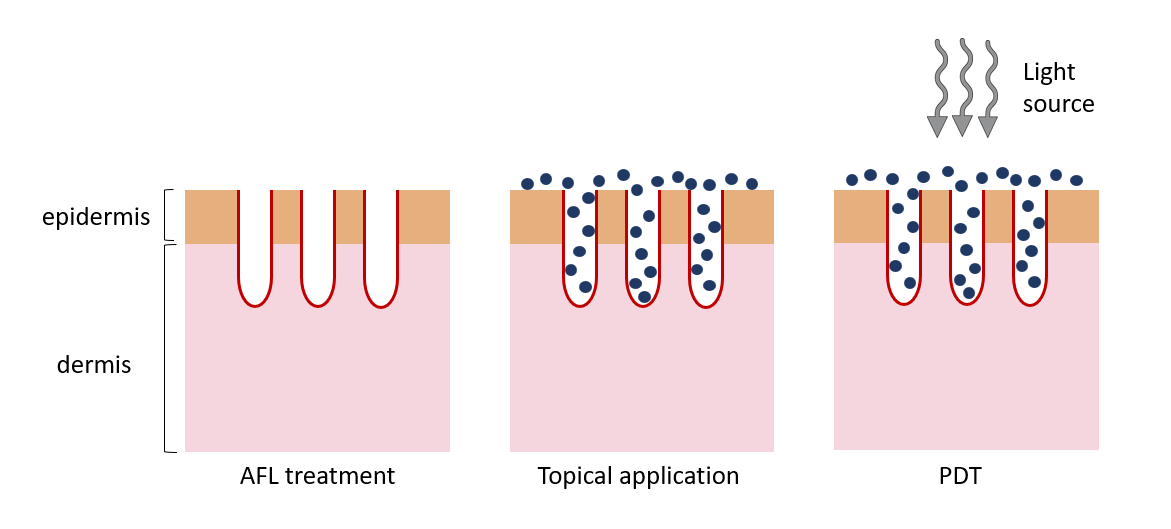
The treatment process using LADD and PDT

=== Photodynamic therapy ===
LADD has been used in adjunction to photodynamic therapy (PDT) as a pre-treatment, which has shown to enhance the absorption of these drugs into the skin. 5-ALA and MAL are common photosensitizers that are used in PDT to treat different skin diseases such as actinic keratoses (AK), Bowen's disease, and superficial cell carcinoma.

==== 5-ALA ====
Lim et al. (2014) utilized nonablative fractional laser Er:YAG to pre-treat twelve treatment areas on the back of 10 healthy males, followed by the incubation of 5-ALA. The results showed that pre-treated areas had higher level of porphyrin fluorescence as compared to non-pretreated areas, which indicated that LADD enhanced 5-ALA skin penetration. In another study, Jang et al. (2013) pre-treated 29 AK patients with an ablative CO_{2} fractional laser, followed by 5-ALA-PDT treatment with varying incubation times. The pre-treatment of laser showed improvement of clinical outcomes even with the short incubation time, with 70.6% of the AK lesions had a complete clinical response to PDT.

==== MAL ====
In a randomized study, Choi et al. used both conventional MAL-PDT and a combination of AFL (Er:YAG) and MAL-PDT to treat 93 AK patients. The group treated with a combination of LADD and PDT showed higher clinical response rate of 91.7% as compared to conventional MAL-PDT group with clinical response rate of 65.6% after three months, and results were persistent after a twelve-month follow-up. In another randomized study with 21 patients with Bowen's disease, the clearance rate of the lesions after 3 months was higher with pre-treatment of one session of ablative fractional Er:YAG followed by MAL-PDT (93.8%) as compared to two sessions of conventional MAL-PDT (73.1%), and with lower recurrence rates (6.7% versus 31.6%).

=== 5-FU ===
5-FU is a common drug which is used to treat cancer and certain skin diseases, such as AK and certain types of nonmelanoma skin cancers. In a case study of 28 patients, including 16 superficial basal cell carcinomas and 14 squamous cell carcinomas in situ, pre-treatment of a single pass of CO_{2}-AFL followed by a single application of 5-FU showed histological clearance of 100% squamous cell carcinomas in situ and 71% of the superficial basal cell carcinomas. In a case report study, a patient with multiple Bowen's disease lesions was selected for a half-side study, one was treated with Er:YAG laser followed by a topical treatment of 5-FU and the other was treated with only 5-FU cream. The legions treated with LADD showed accelerated clinical and histologic response as compared to conventional 5-FU, with no recurrences of lesions after 9 months. In another study, Wenande et al. (2021) showed that CO_{2}-AFL enhanced the efficiency of cisplatin and 5-FU treatment for 20 patients with basal cell carcinoma, with 94.7% patients showed clinical clearance.

=== Corticosteroid ===
Triamcinolone acetonide (TAC) is a common corticosteroid used as a therapeutic strategy for hypertrophic scars and keloids. In a case study, Waibel et al. used CO_{2}-AFL to assist topical TAC delivery to treat 15 patients with hypertrophic and restrictive cutaneous scars. The results showed that significant improvement of the scars was observed after 6 months, with the most impacts on texture. Similarly, in a pilot study, either CO_{2}-AFL or radiofrequency was used in adjunction with ultrasound-assisted TAC to treat alopecia areata, a disease associated with hair loss. All patients showed complete response after the treatment and specifically, the use of LADD with CO_{2}-AFL showed complete response of patients after a single session as compared to a required of three and six sessions for radiofrequency.

=== Vitamin ===
Vitamin C and E are important substances that show antioxidant effects against UV radiation. Transdermal delivery after topical application of these vitamins has been facilitated with LADD. Lee et al. (2003) showed that the application of either nonablative fractional Er:YAG or CO_{2} lasers improved the transdermal penetration of vitamin C significantly. In a split face comparison study regarding UV-induced skin aging, Trelles et al. treated 14 patients with conventional CO_{2}-AFL on one side and CO_{2}-AFL along with the application of vitamin C and E on the other side. As a result, the combination of LADD and vitamins demonstrated a 79% reduction in fine lines as compared to a 69% reduction for AFL-treated side without the delivery of vitamins.

=== Lidocaine ===
Local anesthesia is used widely for dermatological surgeries via topical products or injections. As topical agents have a long incubation time for drug penetration and injections are associated with pain, LADD has been applied to the field for advancing the efficacy of anesthesia. Lidocaine is a local anesthetic cream used to prevent and treat pain. Increase dermal absorption and transdermal bioavailability of lidocaine were seen when using in conjunction with LADD, specifically AFL. Yun et al. demonstrated that 5% lidocaine cream applied after Er:YAG-AFL for a full resurfacing procedure showed significant lower pain score after the first pass of resurfacing, but there were only half of the patients were able to tolerate the second pass. Nevertheless, this indicated that LADD showed an enhancement of lidocaine penetration through the stratum corneum. Similarly, in a double-blind randomized controlled trial with 320 healthy volunteers, the patients were either pre-treated with Er:YAG-AFL followed by 4% lidocaine or treated with topical 4% lidocaine alone before cannulation. The results showed a 62% reduction in pain with the use of LADD as compared to conventional topical lidocaine.

== Safety and adverse events ==
When applying LADD in clinical settings, safety is an imperative factor that needs to be considered. As mentioned above, there are different lasers with distinct properties that could be implemented for patients. However, radiation of any type will damage human tissue to some extent. Some potential adverse events that are laser-induced include erythema, edema, scabbing, blistering, and pigmentary changes, especially at higher intensity and densities. Regarding intralesional therapies for scarring, telangiectasia, hypopigmentation, and skin atrophy have been observed in multiple studies as side effects of LADD. In LADD application for management of pigmentary condition, there are some pigment-related adverse effects such as worsening of melasma, and hyperpigmentation in vitiligo. While LADD improves the dermal infiltration of different medications, the skin also has heightened local reaction when exposed to the substances and external environment. In several studies about AFL-assisted delivery of MAL-photodynamic therapy, there are intensified local cutaneous responses, including burning sensation, pain, edema, pruritus, purpura, and transient pigmentary changes. Furthermore, exposing the underlying dermis and vasculature to the outside environment also increases the risk of infection. AFL-assisted delivery of 5-FU, steroids, and MAL have shown elevated bacterial infections. In general, most LADD safety concerns are related to local reactions similar to that of laser therapy, and are generally well-tolerated with some exceptions.

== Future direction ==
Current studies support the use of LADD in adjunction with topical products in treating dermatological diseases, but these studies are limited in sample size and lack of long-term follow-up outcomes. Larger randomized controlled trials with a wide variety of topical drugs are required to validate the efficacy and side effects of LADD before this technique could be employed as a standard of treatment. Besides its application in drug delivery, the prospect of using LADD to improve the transdermal delivery of vaccines, promote wound healing, correct genetic sequence, and as a complement to inflammatory dermatoses and cosmetic indications is being investigated
