= MK8 =

MK8 may refer to:

- Mario Kart 8, a 2014 kart racing video game
- Kallikrein 8, an enzyme
- Mitsubishi Kinsei (also MK8), a 14-cylinder, air-cooled, twin-row radial aircraft engine
- Volkswagen Golf Mk8, the eighth generation of the Volkswagen Golf vehicle
- Mortal Kombat vs. DC Universe, the eighth main installment in the Mortal Kombat franchise
