= Kallikrein =

Subgroup of serine proteases

Kallikreins are a subgroup of serine proteases, enzymes capable of cleaving peptide bonds in proteins. In humans, plasma kallikrein (encoded by KLKB1 gene) has no known paralogue, while tissue kallikrein-related peptidases (KLKs) encode a family of fifteen closely related serine proteases. These genes are localised to chromosome 19q13, forming the largest contiguous cluster of proteases within the human genome. Kallikreins are responsible for the coordination of various physiological functions including blood pressure, semen liquefaction and skin desquamation.

== Occurrence ==
In 1934, Eugen Werle reported finding a substance in the pancreas of humans and various animals in such large amounts that the pancreas could be taken for its site of origin. He named it kallikrein, by derivation from the Greek word καλλίκρεας (kallíkreas) 'pancreas'. Since then, similar enzymes have been found in the biological fluids of humans and other mammals, as well as in some snake venoms.

=== Venom ===
The caterpillar known as Lagoa crispata contains poison glands attached to hypodermic spines, which produce and inject venom that has been characterized as kallikrein in nature.

The venom of solenodons and some shrews like the northern short-tailed shrew consist of multiple copies of kallikrein 1 (KLK1) serine proteases. KLK1 are very similar to serine protease found in venomous snakes like vipers, and have evolved in parallel from a common toxin precursor, which cause hypotensive effects in vivo.

== Plasma kallikrein ==
The KLKB1 gene encoding plasma kallikrein is located on chromosome 4q34-35. It is synthesised as an inactive precursor, prekallikrein, which must undergo proteolytic processing to become activated. This is facilitated by factor XII, PRCP or other stimuli.

Plasma kallikrein liberates kinins (bradykinin and kallidin) from the kininogens, peptides responsible for the regulation of blood pressure and activation of inflammation. It is also capable of generating plasmin from plasminogen:

Fibrinolysis (simplified). Blue arrows denote stimulation, and red arrows inhibition.

=== Structure ===
Kallikrein is homologous to factor XI and consists of four apple domains and one serine protease domain.

== Tissue kallikreins ==
Distinct from plasma kallikrein, tissue kallikreins (KLKs) are expressed throughout the human body and perform various physiological roles. As some kallikreins are able to catalyse the activation of other kallikreins, several cascades involving these proteases have been implicated in the regulation of homeostatic functions. In some sources, only KLK1 and KLK1B1 are considered true kallikreins, while KLK2-14 are instead referred to as kallikrein-related peptidases.

=== Function ===
- Regulation of Blood Pressure: Like KLKB1, KLK1 also participates in regulating blood pressure via the activation of bradykinin.
- Semen Liquefaction: KLK3, better known as prostate-specific antigen (PSA), is expressed in the prostate and is involved in the liquefaction of semenogelin through hydrolysis. Other family members like KLK2 and KLK14 (and likely others) are involved indirectly through their role in producing PSA by activating proPSA.
- Skin shedding: Desquamation is likely controlled by the interaction of various family members including KLK5, KLK6, KLK7, KLK11, and KLK14, which are expressed in the outermost layer of the epidermis and are involved in cleaving cellular adhesion proteins. In particular, KLK7 likely acts at the end of an enzyme cascade involving other members. For example, KLK5 may auto-activating, then activate KLK7, or KLK6 may auto-activate then activate KLK11, which then activates KLK12, which then activates KLK5, which finally activates KLK7.
- Cleavage of nervous system proteins: KLK6 is the most common member of the Kallikrein family in the nervous system, and deregulation of the enzyme has been discovered in a number of disease states such as Alzheimer's disease, Parkinson's disease, and multiple sclerosis, though its precise role and significance remain unclear. KLK7 and KLK10 are found in cerebrospinal fluid, with different quantities in healthy and Parkinson's disease states. KLK6 and KLK8 are associated with neuronal plasticity in the central nervous system.

=== Genes ===
There are 15 known human tissue kallikreins or kallikrein-related peptide: KLK1, KLK2, KLK3, KLK4, KLK5, KLK6, KLK7, KLK8, KLK9, KLK10, KLK11, KLK12, KLK13, KLK14, KLK15.

=== Clinical significance ===
Kallikrein-related peptidases are targets of active investigation by drug researchers as possible biomarkers for cancer.

Prostate-specific antigen (encoded by the gene KLK3) is tested as a marker for prostate cancer, while both it and other kallikrein family members like KLK1 and KLK2 may be involved in regulating cancer growth indirectly by participating in the degradation of IGF-Binding protein.

Ecallantide, lanadelumab, and berotralstat are FDA-approved drugs that inhibit kallikrein and can be used for managing hereditary angioedema.

A missense variant on KLK15 has been associated with hypermobile Ehlers–Danlos syndrome.

== See also ==
- Prekallikrein
- Kinin-kallikrein system
- Kinin
- Aprotinin
- List of cutaneous conditions
