= Kallikrein-13 =

Protein found in humans

KLK13

Identifiers
- Aliases: KLK13, KLK-L4, KLKL4, kallikrein related peptidase 13
- External IDs: OMIM: 605505; MGI: 3615275; GeneCards: KLK13

Gene location (Mouse)
Chr.	Chromosome 7 (mouse)
Band	7|7 B3	Start	43,361,991 bp
Band	7|7 B3	End	43,376,958 bp
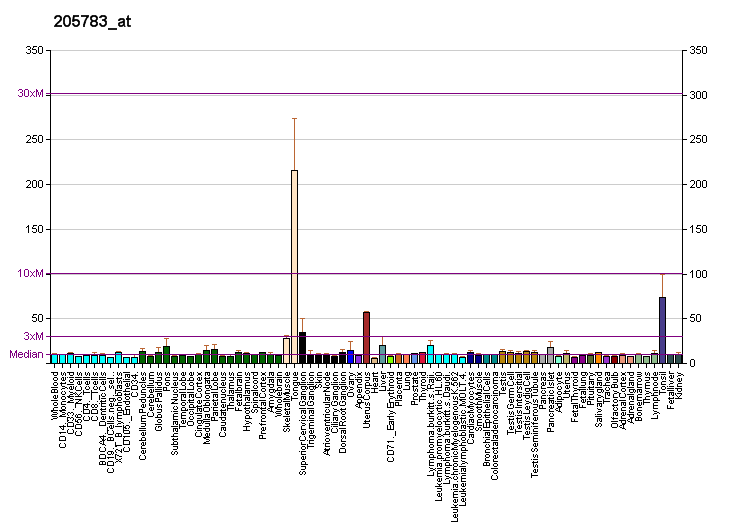

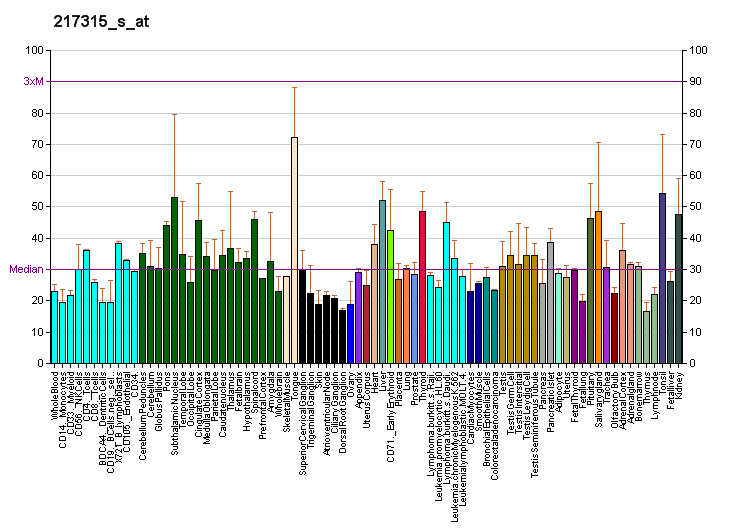
RNA expression pattern
Bgee	Human / Mouse (ortholog); n/a / Top expressed in: esophagus; lip; embryo; embryo; left lung lobe; hair follicle; zygote; stomach; external naris; oocyte
BioGPS	More reference expression data
Gene ontology
Molecular function	peptidase activity; serine-type peptidase activity; endopeptidase activity; serine-type endopeptidase activity; protein binding; hydrolase activity
Cellular component	cytoplasm; extracellular region; extracellular space; secretory granule
Biological process	cornification; proteolysis; protein processing
Sources:Amigo / QuickGO
Orthologs
Databases	NCBI: entry
Species	Human	Mouse
Entrez	26085	626834
Ensembl	n/a	ENSMUSG00000054046
UniProt	Q9UKR3; Q5BQ95; Q5BQ97	n/a
RefSeq (mRNA)	NM_015596	NM_001039042
RefSeq (protein)	NP_056411; NP_001335106; NP_001335107	n/a
Location (UCSC)	n/a	Chr 7: 43.36 – 43.38 Mb
PubMed search
- Wikidata
View/Edit Human	View/Edit Mouse

Kallikrein-13 is a protein that in humans is encoded by the KLK13 gene.

== Function ==
Kallikreins are a subgroup of serine proteases having diverse physiological functions.

As of 2022, the precise physiological functions of Kallikrein 13 remain unknown. It may play a role in the defense of the upper digestive apparatus, in extracellular matrix degradation, in tissue remodelling, and in the male reproductive organs.

This gene is one of the fifteen kallikrein subfamily members located in a cluster on chromosome 19. Expression of this gene is regulated by steroid hormones and may be useful as a marker for breast cancer. An additional transcript variant has been identified, but its full length sequence has not been determined.

Kallikrein-13 serves as a priming protease during infection by the human coronavirus HKU1.

Many kallikreins are implicated in carcinogenesis and some have potential as novel cancer and other disease biomarkers.
