= PRCP =

Protein-coding gene in the species Homo sapiens

Identifiers
- Aliases: PRCP, HUMPCP, PCP, prolylcarboxypeptidase
- External IDs: OMIM: 176785; MGI: 1919711; GeneCards: PRCP
Available structures
PDB	Ortholog search: PDBe RCSB
PDB	List of PDB id codes 3N2Z
Enzyme activity
EC #	BRENDA	ExPASy	KEGG	MetaCyc
3.4.16.2	↗	↗	↗	↗

Gene location (Human)
Chr.	Chromosome 11 (human)
Band	11q14.1	Start	82,822,936 bp
Band	11q14.1	End	82,970,584 bp

Gene location (Mouse)
Chr.	Chromosome 7 (mouse)
Band	7|7 E1	Start	92,523,678 bp
Band	7|7 E1	End	92,583,791 bp
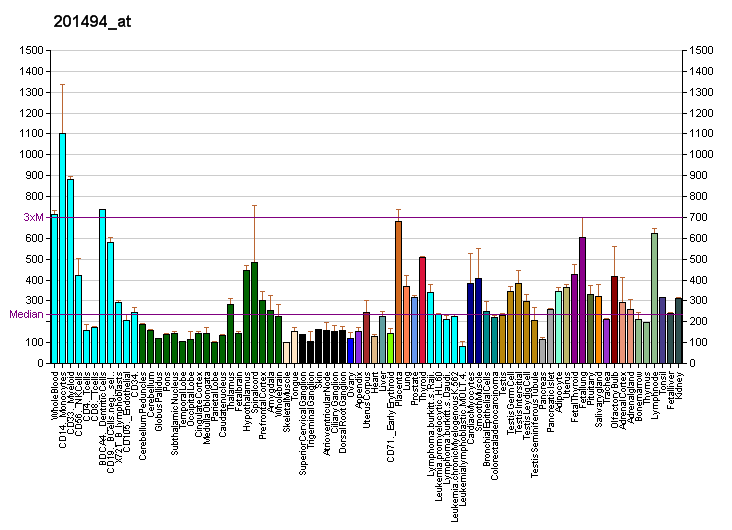
RNA expression pattern
Bgee	Human / Mouse (ortholog); Top expressed in: tendon of biceps brachii; lymph node; monocyte; right adrenal cortex; gallbladder; periodontal fiber; synovial joint; left adrenal gland; urethra; left adrenal cortex / Top expressed in: genital tubercle; tail of embryo; membranous bone; Rostral migratory stream; Dermatocranium; maxilla; dermis; right kidney; body of femur; mandible; More reference expression data
BioGPS	More reference expression data
Gene ontology
Molecular function	serine-type carboxypeptidase activity; peptidase activity; protein binding; carboxypeptidase activity; serine-type peptidase activity; hydrolase activity; dipeptidyl-peptidase activity
Cellular component	basal part of cell; plasma membrane; lysosome; extracellular exosome; azurophil granule membrane; ficolin-1-rich granule membrane
Biological process	blood coagulation, intrinsic pathway; glucose homeostasis; regulation of reactive oxygen species metabolic process; energy homeostasis; plasma kallikrein-kinin cascade; regulation of thyroid hormone mediated signaling pathway; neutrophil degranulation; negative regulation of systemic arterial blood pressure; proteolysis; regulation of blood vessel endothelial cell migration; angiogenesis involved in wound healing
Sources:Amigo / QuickGO
Orthologs
Databases	NCBI: entry; OMA: entry
Species	Human	Mouse
Entrez	5547	72461
Ensembl	ENSG00000137509	ENSMUSG00000061119
UniProt	P42785	Q7TMR0
RefSeq (mRNA)	NM_005040; NM_199418; NM_001319214	NM_028243
RefSeq (protein)	NP_001306143; NP_005031; NP_955450	NP_082519
Location (UCSC)	Chr 11: 82.82 – 82.97 Mb	Chr 7: 92.52 – 92.58 Mb
PubMed search
- Wikidata
View/Edit Human	View/Edit Mouse

Lysosomal Pro-X carboxypeptidase is an enzyme that in humans is encoded by the PRCP gene.

The protein encoded by this gene is a lysosomal prolylcarboxypeptidase, which cleaves C-terminal amino acids linked to proline in peptides such as angiotensin II, III and des-Arg9-bradykinin. The cleavage occurs at acidic pH, but the enzyme activity is retained with some substrates at neutral pH. This enzyme has been shown to be an activator of the cell matrix-associated prekallikrein. The importance of angiotensin II, one of the substrates of this enzyme, in regulating blood pressure and electrolyte balance suggests that this gene may be related to essential hypertension. Alternatively spliced transcript variants encoding distinct isoforms have been observed.
