= Kallikrein-9 =

Enzyme found in humans

KLK9

Identifiers
- Aliases: KLK9, KLK-L3, KLKL3, kallikrein related peptidase 9
- External IDs: OMIM: 605504; MGI: 1921082; GeneCards: KLK9

Gene location (Human)
Chr.	Chromosome 19 (human)
Band	19q13.41	Start	51,002,508 bp
Band	19q13.41	End	51,009,634 bp

Gene location (Mouse)
Chr.	Chromosome 7 (mouse)
Band	7 B3|7 28.26 cM	Start	43,441,315 bp
Band	7 B3|7 28.26 cM	End	43,446,181 bp
RNA expression pattern
Bgee	Human / Mouse (ortholog); Top expressed in: skin of leg; skin of abdomen; mucosa of esophagus; tonsil; vagina; right uterine tube; ectocervix; minor salivary glands; prefrontal cortex; endometrium / Top expressed in: esophagus; lip; zone of skin; embryo; genital tubercle; stomach; tail of embryo; urinary bladder; placenta; thymus; More reference expression data
BioGPS	n/a
Gene ontology
Molecular function	peptidase activity; serine-type peptidase activity; hydrolase activity; serine-type endopeptidase activity
Cellular component	extracellular region; secretory granule
Biological process	proteolysis
Sources:Amigo / QuickGO
Orthologs
Databases	NCBI: entry; OMA: entry
Species	Human	Mouse
Entrez	284366	101533
Ensembl	ENSG00000213022	ENSMUSG00000047884
UniProt	Q9UKQ9	Q32M27
RefSeq (mRNA)	NM_012315	NM_028660
RefSeq (protein)	NP_036447	NP_082936
Location (UCSC)	Chr 19: 51 – 51.01 Mb	Chr 7: 43.44 – 43.45 Mb
PubMed search
- Wikidata
View/Edit Human	View/Edit Mouse

Kallikrein-9 (KLK9) also known as Kallikrein-related peptidase 9 is an enzyme which in humans is encoded by the KLK9 gene.

== Function ==
KLK9 belongs to the kallikrein subgroup of serine proteases, which have diverse physiologic functions in many tissues. KLK9 is primarily expressed in thymus, testis, spinal cord, cerebellum, trachea, mammary gland, prostate, brain, salivary gland, ovary, and skin.

== Clinical significance ==
KLK9 is under steroid hormone regulation in ovarian and breast cancer cell lines and is a potential prognostic marker for early-stage ovarian and breast cancer patients.
