= Kallikrein-10 =

Protein found in humans

KLK10

Identifiers
- Aliases: KLK10, NES1, PRSSL1, kallikrein related peptidase 10
- External IDs: OMIM: 602673; MGI: 1916790; GeneCards: KLK10
Available structures
PDB	Ortholog search: PDBe RCSB
PDB	List of PDB id codes 1SPJ

Gene location (Human)
Chr.	Chromosome 19 (human)
Band	19q13.41	Start	51,012,739 bp
Band	19q13.41	End	51,020,175 bp

Gene location (Mouse)
Chr.	Chromosome 7 (mouse)
Band	7 B3|7 28.26 cM	Start	43,430,459 bp
Band	7 B3|7 28.26 cM	End	43,434,834 bp
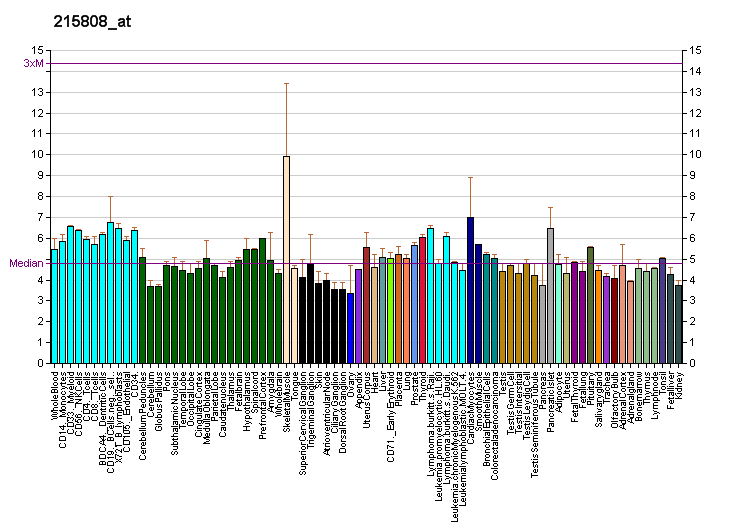

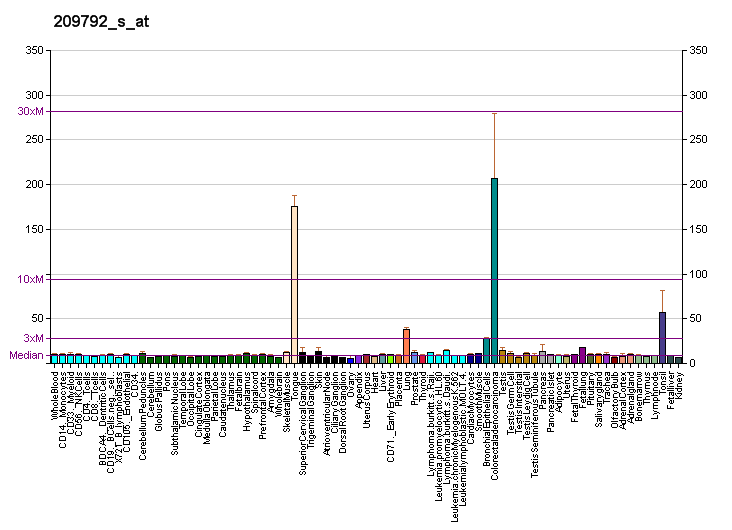
RNA expression pattern
Bgee	Human / Mouse (ortholog); Top expressed in: gums; gingival epithelium; human penis; mucosa of pharynx; oral cavity; vulva; epithelium of esophagus; skin of arm; body of tongue; skin of abdomen / Top expressed in: lip; esophagus; skin of external ear; skin of back; skin of abdomen; cervix; blastocyst; embryo; rectum; stomach; More reference expression data
BioGPS	More reference expression data
Gene ontology
Molecular function	peptidase activity; serine-type peptidase activity; hydrolase activity; serine-type endopeptidase activity
Cellular component	extracellular region; secretory granule
Biological process	cell cycle; proteolysis
Sources:Amigo / QuickGO
Orthologs
Databases	NCBI: entry; OMA: entry
Species	Human	Mouse
Entrez	5655	69540
Ensembl	ENSG00000129451	ENSMUSG00000030693
UniProt	O43240	Q99M20
RefSeq (mRNA)	NM_001077500; NM_002776; NM_145888	NM_133712
RefSeq (protein)	NP_001070968; NP_002767; NP_665895	NP_598473
Location (UCSC)	Chr 19: 51.01 – 51.02 Mb	Chr 7: 43.43 – 43.43 Mb
PubMed search
- Wikidata
View/Edit Human	View/Edit Mouse

Kallikrein-10 is a protein that in humans is encoded by the KLK10 gene. This protein acts as a tumor suppressor in breast and prostate cancer.

Kallikreins are a subgroup of serine proteases having diverse physiological functions. Growing evidence suggests that many kallikreins are implicated in carcinogenesis and some have potential as novel cancer and other disease biomarkers. This gene is one of the fifteen kallikrein subfamily members located in a cluster on chromosome 19. Its encoded protein is secreted and may play a role in suppression of tumorigenesis in breast and prostate cancers. Alternate splicing of this gene results in multiple transcript variants encoding the same protein.
