= Non-competitive inhibition =

Enzyme inhibition

Non-competitive inhibition is a type of enzyme inhibition where the inhibitor reduces the activity of the enzyme and binds equally well to the enzyme regardless of whether it has already bound the substrate. This is unlike competitive inhibition, where binding affinity for the substrate in the enzyme is decreased in the presence of an inhibitor.

The inhibitor may bind to the enzyme regardless of whether the substrate has already been bound, but if it has a higher affinity for binding the enzyme in one state or the other, it is called a mixed inhibitor.

== History ==
During his years working as a physician Leonor Michaelis and a friend Peter Rona built a compact lab, in the hospital, and over the course of five years – Michaelis successfully became published over 100 times. During his research in the hospital, he was the first to view the different types of inhibition; specifically using fructose and glucose as inhibitors of maltase activity. Maltase breaks maltose into two units of glucose. Findings from that experiment allowed for the divergence of non-competitive and competitive inhibition. Non-competitive inhibition affects the k_{cat} value (but not the K_{m}) on any given graph; this inhibitor binds to a site that has specificity for the certain molecule. Michaelis determined that when the inhibitor is bound, the enzyme would become inactivated.

Like many other scientists of their time, Leonor Michaelis and Maud Menten worked on a reaction that was used to change the composition of sucrose and make it lyse into two products – fructose and glucose. The enzyme involved in this reaction is called invertase, and it is the enzyme the kinetics of which have been supported by Michaelis and Menten to be revolutionary for the kinetics of other enzymes. While expressing the rate of the reaction studied, they derived an equation that described the rate in a way which suggested that it is mostly dependent on the enzyme concentration, as well as on presence of the substrate, but only to a certain extent.

Adrian John Brown and Victor Henri laid the groundwork for the discoveries in enzyme kinetics that Michaelis and Menten are known for. Brown theoretically envisioned the mechanism now accepted for enzyme kinetics, but did not have the quantitative data to make a claim. Victor Henri made significant contributions to enzyme kinetics during his doctoral thesis, however he lacked noting the importance of hydrogen ion concentration and mutarotation of glucose. The goal of Henri's thesis was to compare his knowledge of enzyme-catalysed reactions to the recognized laws of physical chemistry. Henri is credited with being the first to write the equation that is now known as the Michaelis-Menten equation. Using glucose and fructose in the catalytic reactions controlled by maltase and invertase, Leonor Michaelis was the first scientist to distinguish the different types of inhibition by using the pH scale which did not exist in Henri's time.

Particularly during their work on describing the rate of this reaction they also tested and extrapolated on the idea of another scientist, Victor Henri, that enzyme they were using had some affinity for both products of this reaction – fructose and glucose. Using Henri's methods, Michaelis and Menten nearly perfected this concept of initial-rate method for steady-state experiments. They were studying inhibition when they found that non-competitive (mixed) inhibition is characterized by its effect on k_{cat} (catalyst rate) while competitive is characterized by its effect on velocity (V). In the Michaelis and Menten experiments they heavily focused on pH effects of invertase using hydrogen ions. Invertase is an enzyme found in extracellular yeast and catalyzed reactions by hydrolysis or inverting a sucrose (mixture of sucrose and fructose) to “invert sugar.” The main reason for using invertase was that it could be easily assayed and experiments could be done in quicker manner. Sucrose rotates in polarimeter as dextroratatory-D whereas invert sugar is levorotatory-L. This made tracking the inversion of sugar relatively simple. They also found that α-D-glucose is released in reactions catalyzed by invertase which is very unstable and spontaneously changes to β-D-glucose. Although, these are both in the dextrorotatory form, this is where they noted that glucose can change spontaneously, also known as mutarotation. Failing to take this into consideration was one of the main reasons Henri's experiments fell short. Using invertase to catalyze sucrose inversion, they could see how fast the enzyme was reacting by polarimetry; therefore, non-competitive inhibition was found to occur in the reaction where sucrose was inverted with invertase.

== Terminology ==
While all non-competitive inhibitors bind the enzyme at allosteric sites (i.e. locations other than its active site)—not all inhibitors that bind at allosteric sites are non-competitive inhibitors. In fact, allosteric inhibitors may act as competitive, non-competitive, or uncompetitive inhibitors.

Many sources continue to conflate these two terms, or state the definition of allosteric inhibition as the definition for non-competitive inhibition.

== Mechanism ==
Illustration of a possible mechanism of non-competitive or mixed inhibition

Non-competitive inhibition models a system where the inhibitor and the substrate may both be bound to the enzyme at any given time. When both the substrate and the inhibitor are bound, the enzyme-substrate-inhibitor complex cannot form product and can only be converted back to the enzyme-substrate complex or the enzyme-inhibitor complex. Non-competitive inhibition is distinguished from general mixed inhibition in that the inhibitor has an equal affinity for the enzyme and the enzyme-substrate complex.

For example, in the enzyme-catalyzed reactions of glycolysis, accumulation phosphoenol is catalyzed by pyruvate kinase into pyruvate. Alanine is an amino acid which is synthesized from pyruvate also inhibits the enzyme pyruvate kinase during glycolysis. Alanine is a non-competitive inhibitor, therefore it binds away from the active site to the substrate in order for it to still be the final product.

Another example of non-competitive inhibition is given by glucose-6-phosphate inhibiting hexokinase in the brain. Carbons 2 and 4 on glucose-6-phosphate contain hydroxyl groups that attach along with the phosphate at carbon 6 to the enzyme-inhibitor complex. The substrate and enzyme are different in their group combinations that an inhibitor attaches to. The ability of glucose-6-phosphate to bind at different places at the same time makes it a non-competitive inhibitor.

The most common mechanism of non-competitive inhibition involves reversible binding of the inhibitor to an allosteric site, but it is possible for the inhibitor to operate via other means including direct binding to the active site. It differs from competitive inhibition in that the binding of the inhibitor does not prevent binding of substrate, and vice versa, but simply prevents product formation for a limited time.

This type of inhibition reduces the maximum rate of a chemical reaction without changing the apparent binding affinity of the catalyst for the substrate (K_{m}^{app} – see Michaelis-Menten kinetics). When a non-competitive inhibitor is added the Vmax is changed, while the Km remains unchanged. According to the Lineweaver-Burk plot the Vmax is reduced during the addition of a non-competitive inhibitor, which is shown in the plot by a change in both the slope and y-intercept when a non-competitive inhibitor is added.

The primary difference between competitive and non-competitive is that competitive inhibition affects the substrate's ability to bind by binding an inhibitor in place of a substrate, which lowers the affinity of the enzyme for the substrate. In non-competitive inhibition, the inhibitor binds to an allosteric site and prevents the enzyme-substrate complex from performing a chemical reaction. This does not affect the Km (affinity) of the enzyme (for the substrate). Non-competitive inhibition differs from uncompetitive inhibition in that it still allows the substrate to bind to the enzyme-inhibitor complex and form an enzyme-substrate-inhibitor complex, this is not true in uncompetitive inhibition, it prevents the substrate from binding to the enzyme inhibitor through conformational change upon allosteric binding.

== Equation ==
In the presence of a non-competitive inhibitor, the apparent enzyme affinity is equivalent to the actual affinity. In terms of Michaelis-Menten kinetics, K_{m}^{app} = K_{m}. This can be seen as a consequence of Le Chatelier's principle because the inhibitor binds to both the enzyme and the enzyme-substrate complex equally so that the equilibrium is maintained. However, since some enzyme is always inhibited from converting the substrate to product, the effective enzyme concentration is lowered.

Mathematically,

$$V_{max}^{app} = \frac{V_{max}}{1+\frac{[\mathrm{I}]}{K_I}}$$

$${apparent\ \mathrm{[E]_0}} = \frac{\mathrm{[E]_0}}{1+\frac{\mathrm{[I]}}{K_I}}$$

== Example: noncompetitive inhibitors of CYP2C9 enzyme ==
Noncompetitive inhibitors of CYP2C9 enzyme include nifedipine, tranylcypromine, phenethyl isothiocyanate, and 6-hydroxyflavone. Computer docking simulation and constructed mutants substituted indicate that the noncompetitive binding site of 6-hydroxyflavone is the reported allosteric binding site of CYP2C9 enzyme.
