= Stratum corneum =

Outermost layer of the epidermis

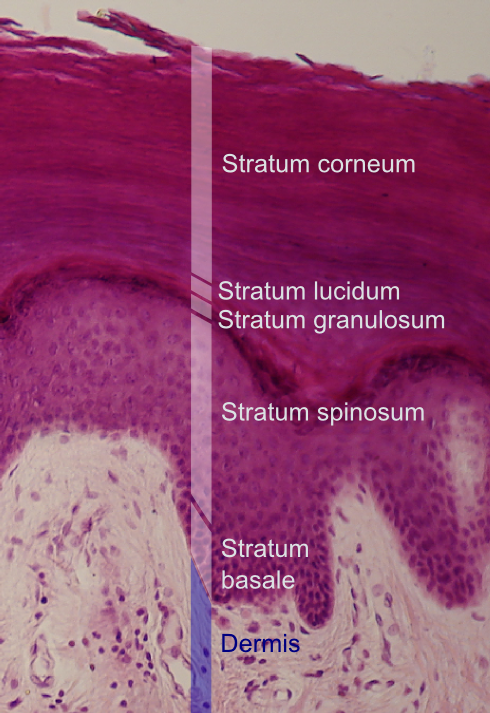
- Histologic image of human epidermis in thick skin

Details
- Precursor: Ectoderm
- Part of: Skin
- System: Integumentary

Identifiers
- Latin: stratum corneum epidermidis

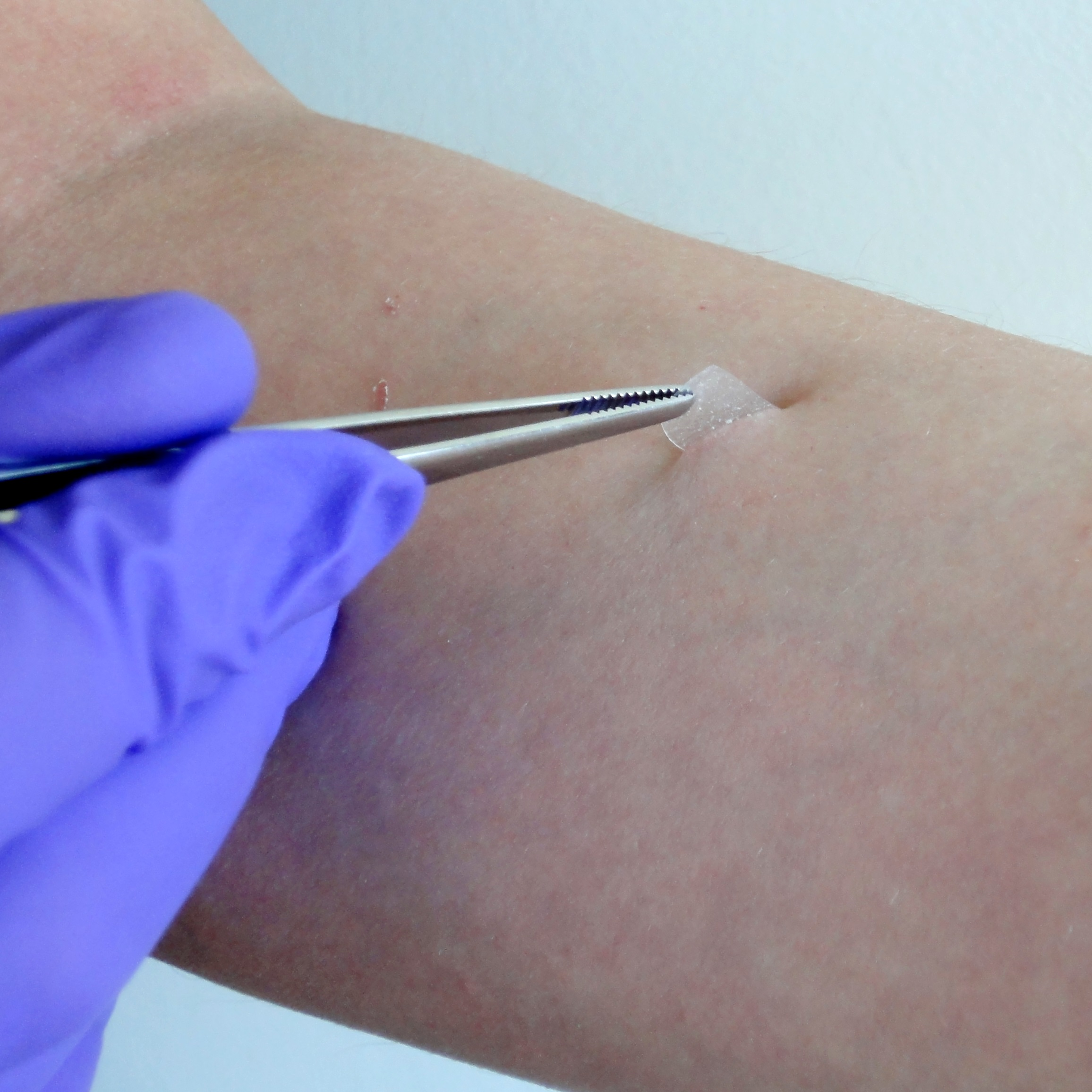
Sampling of human stratum corneum using a tape-stripping method

The stratum corneum (Latin for 'horned/horny layer') is the outermost layer of the epidermis of the tetrapod skin. In human skin, it consists of a stratified squamous epithelium made of 15 to 20 layers of corneocytes, flattened, terminally differentiated keratinocytes that have lost their nuclei or organelles. The filamentous keratin within the cytoplasm of these cells forms a semi-impermeable cuticle that protects underlying tissues from external insults such as dehydration, infection, direct chemical exposure and mechanical abrasion. Hyperkeratosis and hyperplasia of the stratum corneum, often in response to excessive abrasions or impacts, can lead to the formation of hardened skin conditions such as calluses, corns and hangnails.

Among the properties of the stratum corneum are mechanical shear, impact resistance, water flux and hydration regulation, microbial proliferation and invasion regulation, initiation of inflammation through cytokine activation and dendritic cell activity, and selective permeability to exclude toxins, irritants and allergens. The corneocytes are embedded in a lipid matrix composed of ceramides, cholesterol, and fatty acids, preventing desiccation and enhancing the overall cohesive strength of the stratum corneum while allowing some pliability.

The natural shedding process of surface dead corneocytes off the stratum corneum is known as desquamation or "sloughing", while deliberate, artificial removal of dead skin cells from the stratum corneum is called exfoliation. Adequate desquamation can help balancing proliferating keratinocytes that form in the stratum basale. These cells migrate through the epidermis towards the surface in a journey that takes approximately fourteen days.

== Structure ==
The human stratum corneum comprises several levels of flattened corneocytes that are divided into two layers: the stratum disjunctum and stratum compactum. The stratum disjunctum is the uppermost and loosest layer of skin. The skin's protective acid mantle and lipid barrier sit on top of the stratum disjunctum. The stratum compactum is the comparatively deeper, more compacted and more cohesive part of the stratum corneum. The corneocytes of the stratum disjunctum are larger, more rigid and more hydrophobic than those of the stratum compactum.

Research on osmotic permeability suggests the stratum compactum consists of two layers. The stratum disjunctum above these layers can swell, as can the lowest layer of the stratum disjunctum up to two-fold. However, the first layer in the stratum compactum between them has limited swelling capacity and provides the stratum corneum's barrier.

== Function ==
During cornification, the process whereby living keratinocytes are transformed into non-living corneocytes, the cell membrane is replaced by a layer of ceramides which become covalently linked to an envelope of structural proteins (the cornified envelope). This complex surrounds cells in the stratum corneum and contributes to the skin's barrier function. Corneodesmosomes (modified desmosomes) facilitate cellular adhesion by linking adjacent cells within this epidermal layer. These complexes are degraded by proteases, eventually permitting cells to be shed at the surface. Desquamation and formation of the cornified envelope are both required for the maintenance of skin homeostasis. A failure to correctly regulate these processes leads to skin disorders.

Cells of the stratum corneum contain a dense network of keratin, a protein that helps keep the skin hydrated by preventing water evaporation. These cells can also absorb water, further aiding in hydration. In addition, this layer is responsible for the "spring back" or stretchy properties of skin. A weak glutenous protein bond pulls the skin back to its natural shape.

The thickness of the stratum corneum varies throughout the body. In the palms of the hands and the soles of the feet (sometimes knees, elbows, and knuckles) this layer is stabilized and built by the stratum lucidum (clear phase) which allows the cells to concentrate keratin and toughen them before they rise into a typically thicker, more cohesive stratum corneum. The mechanical stress of heavy structural strain causes this stratum lucidum phase in these regions which require additional protection in order to grasp objects, resist abrasion or impact, and avoid injury. In general, the stratum corneum contains 15 to 20 layers of corneocytes. The stratum corneum has a thickness of between 10 and 40 μm.

In reptiles, the stratum corneum is permanent, and is replaced only during times of rapid growth, in a process called ecdysis or moulting. This is conferred by the presence of beta-keratin, which provides a much more rigid skin layer.

In the human forearm, about 1,300 cells per cm^{2} per hour are shed. The stratum corneum protects the internal structures of the body from external injury and bacterial invasion.

== Skin disease ==
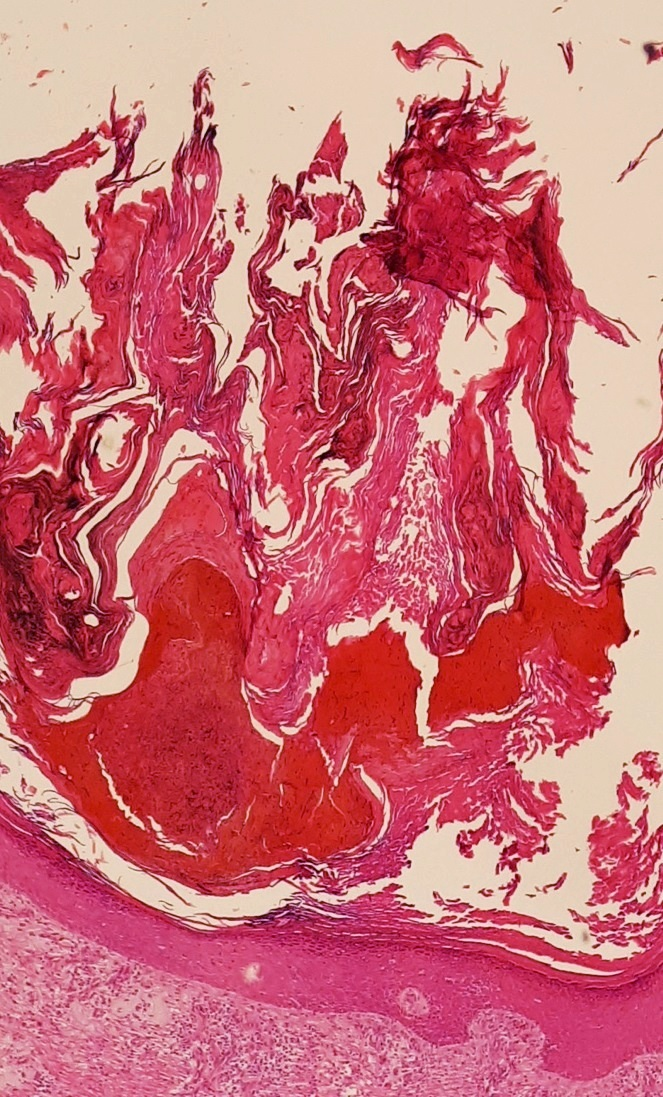
Micrograph showing prominent hyperkeratosis in skin without atypia. H&E stain.

An inability to correctly maintain the skin barrier function due to the dysregulation of epidermal components can lead to skin disorders. For example, a failure to modulate the activity of kallikreins via the disruption of the protease inhibitor LEKTI causes the debilitating disorder Netherton syndrome.

Hyperkeratosis is an increased thickness of the stratum corneum, and is an unspecific finding, seen in many skin conditions.

== See also ==
- Epidermis (skin)
- Hexastix
- Kallikrein-5
- Peeling skin syndrome
- Stratum granulosum
- Stratum spinosum
