= Matriptase =

Identifiers
- EC no.: 3.4.21.109
- CAS no.: 241475-96-7

Databases
- IntEnz: IntEnz view
- BRENDA: BRENDA entry
- ExPASy: NiceZyme view
- KEGG: KEGG entry
- MetaCyc: metabolic pathway
- PRIAM: profile
- PDB structures: RCSB PDB PDBe PDBsum
Search
- PMC: articles
- PubMed: articles
- NCBI: proteins

Peptidase S1A, matripase

Identifiers
- Symbol: S1A
- InterPro: IPR017051
- Membranome: 1287

Matriptases (EC 3.4.21.109) are an enzyme family. This enzyme cleaves various synthetic substrates with Arg or Lys at the P1 position and prefers small side-chain amino acids, such as Ala and Gly, at the P2 position

This trypsin-like integral-membrane serine peptidase has been implicated in breast cancer invasion and metastasis. It belongs to proteases of PA superfamily.

== Human matriptases ==
- ST14, also known as matriptase
- TMPRSS6, also known as matriptase 2
