= Kallikrein-15 =

Enzyme found in humans

KLK15

Identifiers
- Aliases: KLK15, ACO, HSRNASPH, kallikrein related peptidase 15
- External IDs: OMIM: 610601; MGI: 2447533; GeneCards: KLK15

Gene location (Human)
Chr.	Chromosome 19 (human)
Band	19q13.33	Start	50,825,289 bp
Band	19q13.33	End	50,837,213 bp

Gene location (Mouse)
Chr.	Chromosome 7 (mouse)
Band	7 B3|7 28.41 cM	Start	43,583,164 bp
Band	7 B3|7 28.41 cM	End	43,589,063 bp
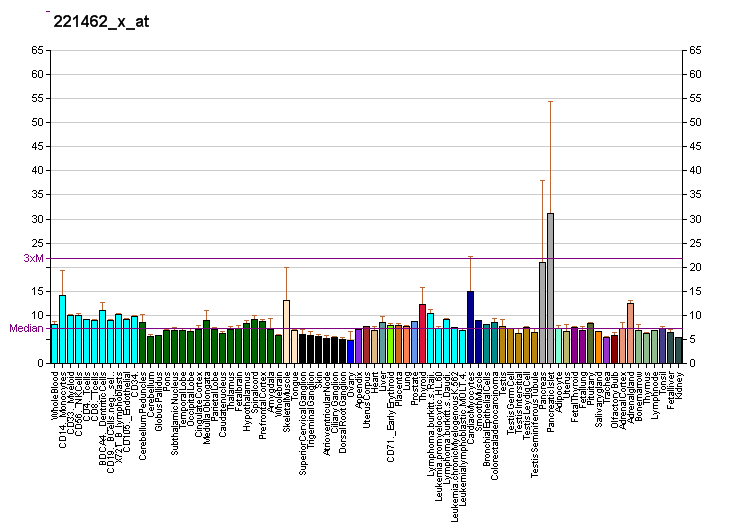
RNA expression pattern
Bgee	Human / Mouse (ortholog); Top expressed in: vena cava; tendon of biceps brachii; Skeletal muscle tissue of rectus abdominis; cerebellar vermis; parotid gland; body of tongue; buccal mucosa cell; right ventricle; pons; pericardium / Top expressed in: lip; embryo; secondary oocyte; primary oocyte; zygote; placenta; spermatid; genital tubercle; zone of skin; right kidney; More reference expression data
BioGPS	More reference expression data
Gene ontology
Molecular function	peptidase activity; serine-type peptidase activity; protein binding; hydrolase activity; serine-type endopeptidase activity
Cellular component	extracellular region; secretory granule
Biological process	proteolysis
Sources:Amigo / QuickGO
Orthologs
Databases	NCBI: entry; OMA: entry
Species	Human	Mouse
Entrez	55554	317652
Ensembl	ENSG00000174562	ENSMUSG00000055193
UniProt	Q9H2R5	n/a
RefSeq (mRNA)	NM_001277081; NM_001277082; NM_017509; NM_023006; NM_138563 NM_138564	NM_174865
RefSeq (protein)	NP_001264010; NP_001264011; NP_059979	n/a
Location (UCSC)	Chr 19: 50.83 – 50.84 Mb	Chr 7: 43.58 – 43.59 Mb
PubMed search
- Wikidata
View/Edit Human	View/Edit Mouse

Kallikrein-15 is an enzyme that in humans is encoded by the KLK15 gene. This enzyme is a protease, but it is not yet known what kind of protein it acts on.

Kallikreins are a subgroup of serine proteases having diverse physiological functions. Growing evidence suggests that many kallikreins are implicated in carcinogenesis and some have potential as novel cancer and other disease biomarkers. This gene is one of the fifteen kallikrein subfamily members located in a cluster on chromosome 19. In prostate cancer, this gene has increased expression, which indicates its possible use as a diagnostic or prognostic marker for prostate cancer. The gene contains multiple polyadenylation sites and alternative splicing results in multiple transcript variants encoding distinct isoforms.
