= Prekallikrein =

Serine protease

Prekallikrein (PK), also known as Fletcher factor, is an 85,000 Mr serine protease that complexes with high-molecular-weight kininogen. PK is the precursor of plasma kallikrein, which is a serine protease that activates kinins. PK is cleaved to produce kallikrein by activated Factor XII (Hageman factor).

== Structure ==
Prekallikrein is homologous to factor XI, and similarly consists of four apple domains and a fifth, catalytic serine protease domain. The four apple domains create a disk-like platform around the base of the catalytic domain. However, unlike factor XI, prekallikrein does not form dimers.

Prekallikrein is activated to form kallikrein by factor XII cleavage of a bond homologous to the corresponding bond cleaved during factor XI activation.

== Prekallikrein deficiency ==
Hereditary deficiencies in PK are very rare. They can cause a prolonged APTT, which can be corrected by incubation of the patient's plasma.

Deficiencies in PK can also be acquired due to some disease states, such as angioedema, infection, DIC, and sickle-cell disease.

Although most cases of prekallikrein deficiency are asymptomatic, a few reports link severe prekallikrein deficiency with thrombotic phenomena and recurrent pregnancy loss. More recently, a case of prekallikrein deficiency was shown to be associated with severe mucosal bleeding.

== Discovery of prekallikrein ==
PK was initially described by Hathaway et al. in 1965 after encountering a Kentucky family who exhibited strikingly abnormal APTT results, but showed no bleeding symptoms. The family appeared to have a hereditary deficiency in an unknown coagulation factor, dubbed “Fletcher factor” after the family. In 1973 Kirk Wuepper determined that Fletcher factor and prekallikrein were the same.
