= Kallikrein-12 =

Protein-coding gene in the species Homo sapiens

An Error has occurred retrieving Wikidata item for infobox Kallikrein-12 is a protein that in humans is encoded by the KLK12 gene.

Kallikreins are a subgroup of serine proteases having diverse physiological functions. Growing evidence suggests that many kallikreins are implicated in carcinogenesis and some have potential as novel cancer and other disease biomarkers. This gene is one of the fifteen kallikrein subfamily members located in a cluster on chromosome 19. Alternate splicing of this gene results in three transcript variants encoding different isoforms.
