= PAN domain =

PAN_1
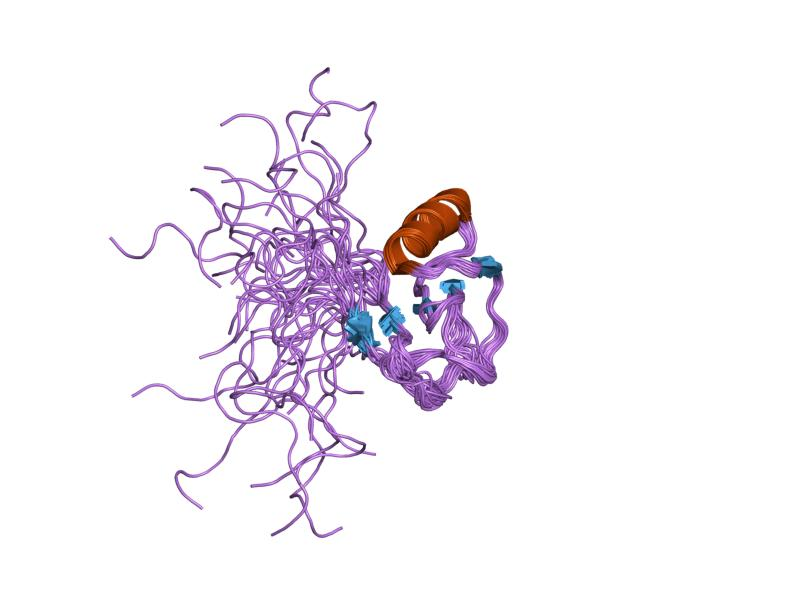
- Solution structure of a PAN module from Eimeria tenella

Identifiers
- Symbol: PAN_1
- Pfam: PF00024
- Pfam clan: CL0168
- InterPro: IPR003014
- PROSITE: PDOC00376
- SCOP2: 1bht / SCOPe / SUPFAM
Available protein structures:
- Pfam: structures / ECOD
- PDB: RCSB PDB; PDBe; PDBj
- PDBsum: structure summary

PAN domains have significant functional versatility fulfilling diverse biological roles by mediating protein-protein and protein-carbohydrate interactions. These domains contain a hair-pin loop like structure, similar to that found in knottins but with a different pattern of disulfide bonds.

It has been shown that the N-terminal domains of members of the plasminogen/hepatocyte growth factor family, the apple domains of the plasma prekallikrein/coagulation factor XI family, and domains of various nematode proteins belong to the same module superfamily, the PAN module. The PAN domain contains a conserved core of three disulfide bridges. In some members of the family there is an additional fourth disulfide bridge that links the N- and C-termini of the domain.

The apple domain, as well as other examples of the PAN domain, consists of seven β-strands that fold into a curved antiparallel sheet cradling an α-helix. Two disulfide bonds lock the helix onto the central β4 and β5 strands, whereas a third connects the N- and C-termini of the domain. In the apple domain, the β4–β5 loop and β5–β6 crossover loop generate a small pocket on the opposite side of the sheet from the α-helix.

In native plasminogen the PAN domain is associated with five kringle domains. The interactions between the PAN domain and the kringles play a critical role in stabilising the quaternary complex of the native plasminogen;
