= Kallikrein-8 =

Enzyme found in humans

KLK8
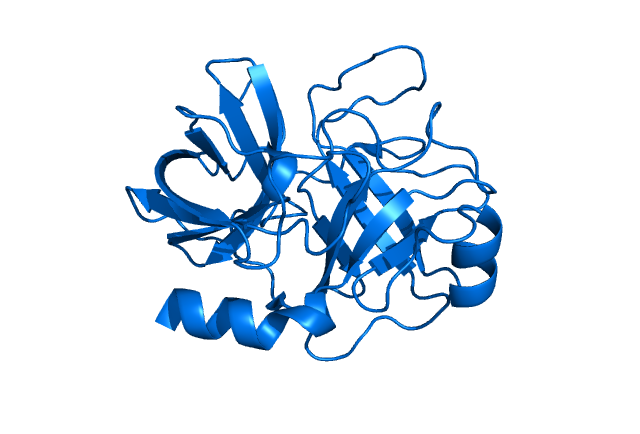

Identifiers
- Aliases: KLK8, HNP, NP, NRPN, PRSS19, TADG14, kallikrein related peptidase 8, neuropsin
- External IDs: OMIM: 605644; MGI: 1343327; GeneCards: KLK8
Available structures
PDB	Ortholog search: PDBe RCSB
PDB	List of PDB id codes 1NPM
Enzyme activity
EC #	BRENDA	ExPASy	KEGG	MetaCyc
3.4.21.118	↗	↗	↗	↗

Gene location (Human)
Chr.	Chromosome 19 (human)
Band	19q13.41	Start	50,996,007 bp
Band	19q13.41	End	51,002,711 bp

Gene location (Mouse)
Chr.	Chromosome 7 (mouse)
Band	7 B3|7 28.26 cM	Start	43,447,001 bp
Band	7 B3|7 28.26 cM	End	43,453,250 bp
RNA expression pattern
Bgee	Human / Mouse (ortholog); Top expressed in: skin of abdomen; skin of leg; testicle; right uterine tube; vagina; human penis; oral cavity; minor salivary glands; vulva; gonad / Top expressed in: lip; esophagus; superior surface of tongue; skin of external ear; vas deferens; embryo; embryo; epiblast; skin of abdomen; blood; More reference expression data
BioGPS	n/a
Gene ontology
Molecular function	peptidase activity; serine-type peptidase activity; serine-type endopeptidase activity; protein binding; hydrolase activity
Cellular component	cytoplasm; extracellular region; extracellular space; serine protease inhibitor complex; secretory granule
Biological process	synapse organization; keratinocyte proliferation; negative regulation of axon regeneration; neuron projection morphogenesis; cell death; memory; response to wounding; negative regulation of myelination; regulation of synapse organization; proteolysis
Sources:Amigo / QuickGO
Orthologs
Databases	NCBI: entry; OMA: entry
Species	Human	Mouse
Entrez	11202	259277
Ensembl	ENSG00000129455	ENSMUSG00000064023
UniProt	O60259	Q61955
RefSeq (mRNA)	NM_001281431; NM_007196; NM_144505; NM_144506; NM_144507	NM_008940; NM_001324398
RefSeq (protein)	NP_001268360; NP_009127; NP_653088; NP_653089; NP_653090	NP_001311327; NP_032966
Location (UCSC)	Chr 19: 51 – 51 Mb	Chr 7: 43.45 – 43.45 Mb
PubMed search
- Wikidata
View/Edit Human	View/Edit Mouse

Kallikrein 8

Identifiers
- EC no.: 3.4.21.118
- CAS no.: 171715-15-4

Databases
- BRENDA: enzyme data
- ExPASy: NiceZyme view
- KEGG: enzyme entry
- MetaCyc: metabolic pathway
- Rhea: reactions
- PDB structures: RCSB PDB PDBe PDBsum
Search
- PMC: articles
- PubMed: articles
- NCBI: proteins

Kallikrein-8 is an enzyme that in humans is encoded by the KLK8 gene. This enzyme can break down a number of proteins, including casein, fibrinogen, kininogen, fibronectin and collagen type IV. It also plays a role in the regulation of neuronal activity through its cleavage of L1CAM.

== Overview ==
Kallikreins are a subgroup of serine proteases having diverse physiological functions. Growing evidence suggests that many kallikreins are implicated in carcinogenesis and some have potential as novel cancer and other disease biomarkers. This gene is one of the fifteen kallikrein subfamily members located in a cluster on chromosome 19. Alternate splicing of this gene results in four transcript variants encoding four different isoforms. The isoforms exhibit distinct patterns of expression that suggest roles in brain plasticity and ovarian cancer.

== Function ==
Kallikrein-8 (EC 3.4.21.118), is an enzyme that catalyses the following chemical reaction:

Cleavage of amide substrates following the basic amino acids Arg or Lys at the P1 position, with a preference for Arg over Lys

The enzyme is activated by removal of an N-terminal prepropeptide.
