= Kallikrein-4 =

Mammalian protein found in Homo sapiens

KLK4
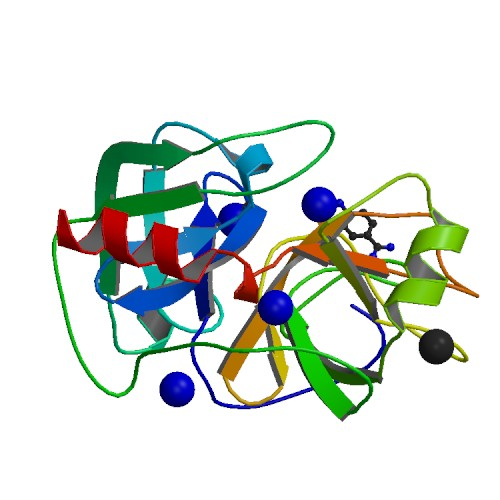

Identifiers
- Aliases: KLK4, AI2A1, ARM1, EMSP, EMSP1, KLK-L1, PRSS17, PSTS, kallikrein, kallikrein related peptidase 4
- External IDs: OMIM: 603767; MGI: 1861379; GeneCards: KLK4
Available structures
PDB	Ortholog search: PDBe RCSB
PDB	List of PDB id codes 2BDG, 2BDH, 2BDI, 4K1E, 4K8Y, 4KEL, 4KGA

Gene location (Human)
Chr.	Chromosome 19 (human)
Band	19q13.41	Start	50,906,351 bp
Band	19q13.41	End	50,911,395 bp

Gene location (Mouse)
Chr.	Chromosome 7 (mouse)
Band	7 B3|7 28.35 cM	Start	43,530,584 bp
Band	7 B3|7 28.35 cM	End	43,535,228 bp
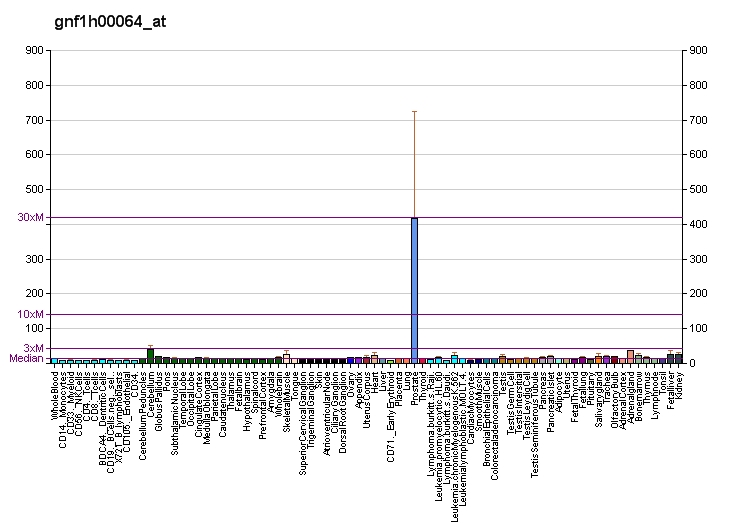
RNA expression pattern
Bgee	Human / Mouse (ortholog); Top expressed in: prostate; mucosa of transverse colon; testicle; skin of leg; skin of abdomen; gonad; salivary gland; minor salivary glands; left lobe of thyroid gland; canal of the cervix / Top expressed in: molar; decidua; thymus; muscle; rhombencephalon; pituitary gland; adipose tissue; brown adipose tissue; muscle tissue; torso; More reference expression data
BioGPS	More reference expression data
Gene ontology
Molecular function	peptidase activity; serine-type peptidase activity; protein binding; hydrolase activity; metal ion binding; serine-type endopeptidase activity
Cellular component	extracellular region; secretory granule
Biological process	proteolysis; amelogenesis; biomineral tissue development; extracellular matrix disassembly
Sources:Amigo / QuickGO
Orthologs
Databases	NCBI: entry; OMA: entry
Species	Human	Mouse
Entrez	9622	56640
Ensembl	ENSG00000167749	ENSMUSG00000006948
UniProt	Q9Y5K2	Q9Z0M1
RefSeq (mRNA)	NM_001302961; NM_004917	NM_019928
RefSeq (protein)	NP_001289890; NP_004908	NP_064312
Location (UCSC)	Chr 19: 50.91 – 50.91 Mb	Chr 7: 43.53 – 43.54 Mb
PubMed search
- Wikidata
View/Edit Human	View/Edit Mouse

Kallikrein-4, also called Kallikrein-related peptidase 4, is a protein which in humans is encoded by the KLK4 gene. This protein plays an important role in tooth enamel formation, and mutations in the gene are associated with enamel defects.

Kallikreins are a subgroup of serine proteases having diverse physiological functions. Growing evidence suggests that many kallikreins are implicated in carcinogenesis and some have potential as novel cancer and other disease biomarkers. In particular, they may serve as biomarkers for both prostate cancer and breast cancer.

This gene is one of the fifteen kallikrein subfamily members located in a cluster on chromosome 19. In some tissues its expression is hormonally regulated. The expression pattern of a similar mouse protein in murine developing teeth supports a role for the protein in the degradation of enamel proteins. Alternate splice variants for this gene have been described, but their biological validity has not been determined.
