= Kallikrein-2 =

Protein-coding gene in the species Homo sapiens

An Error has occurred retrieving Wikidata item for infobox Kallikrein-2 is a protein that in humans is encoded by the KLK2 gene. Like others in the kallikrein family, it is a protease enzyme, which means it participates in breaking bonds between amino acids in proteins and/or peptides. KLK2 is particularly associated with prostatic tissue, where it is involved in activating the related enzyme prostate-specific antigen (aka KLK3). It accomplishes this by cleaving off certain amino acids from inactive precursor of prostate-specific antigen (called proPSA).
