= Kallikrein-6 =

Protein-coding gene in the species Homo sapiens

An Error has occurred retrieving Wikidata item for infobox Kallikrein-6 is a protein that in humans is encoded by the KLK6 gene. Kallikrein-6 is also referred to as neurosin, protease M, hK6, or zyme. It is a 223 amino acid sequence, derived from its 244 original form, which contains a 16 residue presignal and 5 residue activation peptide.

== Function ==
Kallikreins are a subgroup of serine proteases having diverse physiological functions. Growing evidence suggests that many kallikreins are implicated in carcinogenesis and some have potential as novel cancer and other disease biomarkers. This gene is one of the fifteen kallikrein subfamily members located in a cluster on chromosome 19. The encoded enzyme is regulated by steroid hormones. In tissue culture, the enzyme has been found to generate amyloidogenic fragments from the amyloid precursor protein, suggesting a potential for involvement in Alzheimer's disease. Multiple alternatively spliced transcript variants that encode different isoforms have been identified for this gene.

== Structure ==
The secondary structure consists of 13 beta-pleated sheets, 2 alpha-helices, 2 3_{10}-helices, and 8 loop regions. In terms of amino acid sequences, hK6 is most similar to myelencephalon-specific protease (MSP), which comes from the rat kvllikrein gene family. MSP and hK6 both target the peptide bond where arginine follows and they both automatically cleave themselves at their Arg positions.

However, structurally, hK6 most resembles trypsin found in cows/oxen. Surrounding the active site, there are short loop regions that point away from the binding site. In the binding site, residues 189-195, 214-220, and 224-228 are found in addition to the Asp, His, and Ser residues.

== Disease Pathology ==
Alpha-synuclein build-up is commonly found in Dementia with Lewy bodies, Parkinson's disease, and multiple system atrophy patients, serving as a biomarker for infection. Thus, degradation of this protein is necessary to prevent infection. In mice brain samples, protease inhibitors were used to identify the protein responsible for alpha-synuclein degradation. Various serine protease inhibitors (aprotinin, phenylmethyl sulfonyl fluoride, leupeptin, and 4-(2-aminoethyl)-benzenesulfonyl fluoride). significantly affected the degradation pathway, which justifies the necessity for a serine protease to degrade alpha-synuclein.

Kallikrein inhibitor was introduced to the mice samples, and it successfully inhibited kallikrein function. In vitro studies utilizing purified kallikrein were also performed on alpha-synuclein, and it was effective in degrading alpha-synuclein. Both the inhibition and successful in vitro enzymatic activity demonstrates kallikrein as the degradation enzyme.

While hK6 has contributed to disease prevention, it also has the potential to contribute to the spread of malignant tumor cells. As a degradation enzyme, it has the capability of degrading extracellular matrix proteins on both normal and malignant cells, which would enhance their abilities to migrate and to send signals. For example, fibronectin interacts with integral molecules as malignant cells try to migrate; by degrading it, malignant cells are able to migrate, attach, and send a signal to other malignant cells.

== Neurosin Mechanism ==
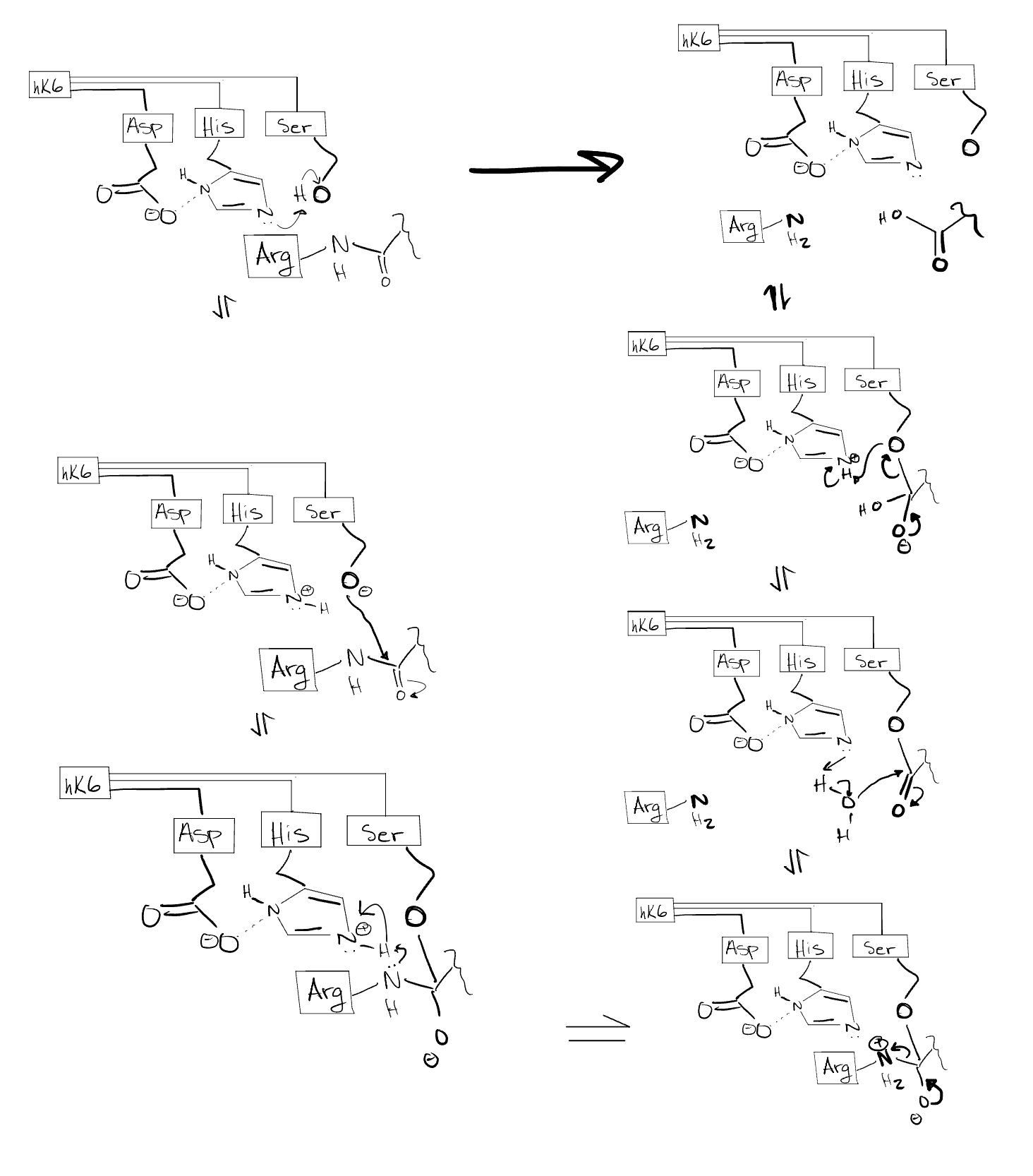
Asp, His, and Ser form a catalytic triad around a peptide that has Arg towards the N-terminus and a general amino acid to the C-terminus.

Asp-102, His-57, and Ser-195 form a catalytic triad to specifically hydrolyze a peptide bond where Arg is towards the N terminus and a general amino acid is towards the C terminus. It is believed to follow a similar pathway to other serine-type proteases.

1. Histidine deprotonates serine
2. Serine substitutes in at the amide bond
3. The protonated histidine makes the amine a better leaving group and the oxyanion collapses to form the ester.
4. Water enters the triad and cleaves the ester bond, releasing serine.
