= Kallikrein-14 =

Enzyme found in humans

KLK14

Identifiers
- Aliases: KLK14, KLK-L6, kallikrein related peptidase 14
- External IDs: OMIM: 606135; MGI: 2447564; GeneCards: KLK14

Gene location (Human)
Chr.	Chromosome 19 (human)
Band	19q13.41	Start	51,077,495 bp
Band	19q13.41	End	51,084,245 bp

Gene location (Mouse)
Chr.	Chromosome 7 (mouse)
Band	7 B3|7 28.26 cM	Start	43,339,842 bp
Band	7 B3|7 28.26 cM	End	43,344,960 bp
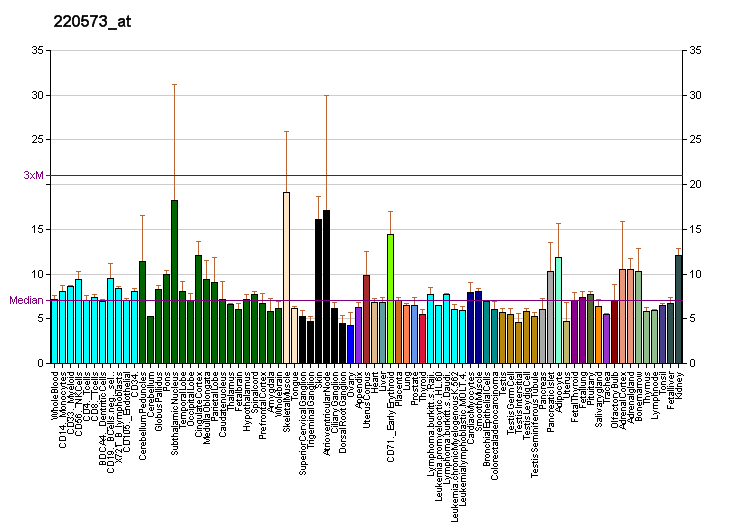
RNA expression pattern
Bgee	Human / Mouse (ortholog); Top expressed in: skin of leg; skin of abdomen; apex of heart; mucosa of transverse colon; left ventricle; right auricle of heart; right hemisphere of cerebellum; ectocervix; vagina; right frontal lobe / Top expressed in: esophagus; lip; embryo; primary oocyte; morula; secondary oocyte; zygote; bone marrow; white adipose tissue; zone of skin; More reference expression data
BioGPS	More reference expression data
Gene ontology
Molecular function	peptidase activity; serine-type peptidase activity; serine-type endopeptidase activity; hydrolase activity
Cellular component	extracellular region; extracellular space; secretory granule
Biological process	fertilization; epidermis morphogenesis; seminal clot liquefaction; positive regulation of G protein-coupled receptor signaling pathway; negative regulation of G protein-coupled receptor signaling pathway; proteolysis; cornification
Sources:Amigo / QuickGO
Orthologs
Databases	NCBI: entry; OMA: entry
Species	Human	Mouse
Entrez	43847	317653
Ensembl	ENSG00000129437	ENSMUSG00000044737
UniProt	Q9P0G3	Q8CGR5
RefSeq (mRNA)	NM_001311182; NM_022046; NM_001369775	NM_174866
RefSeq (protein)	NP_001298111; NP_071329; NP_001356704	NP_777355
Location (UCSC)	Chr 19: 51.08 – 51.08 Mb	Chr 7: 43.34 – 43.34 Mb
PubMed search
- Wikidata
View/Edit Human	View/Edit Mouse

Kallikrein-14 is an enzyme that in humans is encoded by the KLK14 gene.

Kallikreins are a subgroup of serine proteases having diverse physiological functions. Growing evidence suggests that many kallikreins are implicated in carcinogenesis and some have potential as novel cancer, skin disorders and other disease biomarkers. This gene is one of the fifteen kallikrein subfamily members located in a cluster on chromosome 19. Apart from its common transcript, an additional transcript variant has been described but its difference in function and full length nature has not been determined.

KLK14 displays optimal trypsin-like activity at an alkaline pH of 8.0 and remains active in the pH ranges of 5.0 - 9.0 and is produced as a zymogen, but can function also in a chymotrypsin-like fashion. Activation of KLK14 is mediated by KLK5 and after KLK14 activation, it further amplifies the activity of KLK proteases by a positive feedback loop via cleavage of pro-KLK5, which is a central player in KLK cascade. KLK14 function has not yet been fully elucidated, but its most notable substrate is PAR2. Its activity is inhibited by a wide variety of proteins, like macroglobulins, serpins, and the serine protease inhibitor lympho-epithelial Kazal-type-related inhibitor (LEKTI) and also micro-environmental pH; and single-metal-ion inhibitors of KLKs among others.
