= Kallikrein-5 =

Protein-coding gene in the species Homo sapiens

KLK5
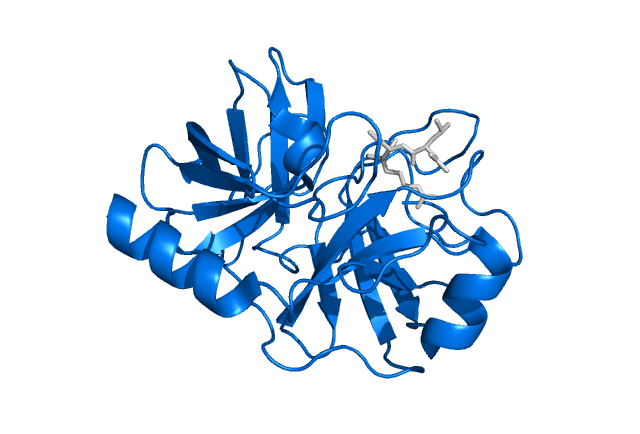

Identifiers
- Aliases: KLK5, KLK-L2, KLKL2, SCTE, kallikrein related peptidase 5
- External IDs: OMIM: 605643; MGI: 1915918; GeneCards: KLK5
Available structures
PDB	Human UniProt search: PDBe RCSB
PDB	List of PDB id codes 2PSX, 2PSY

Gene location (Human)
Chr.	Chromosome 19 (human)
Band	19q13.41	Start	50,943,303 bp
Band	19q13.41	End	50,953,093 bp

Gene location (Mouse)
Chr.	Chromosome 7 (mouse)
Band	7 B3|7 28.3 cM	Start	43,491,395 bp
Band	7 B3|7 28.3 cM	End	43,500,605 bp
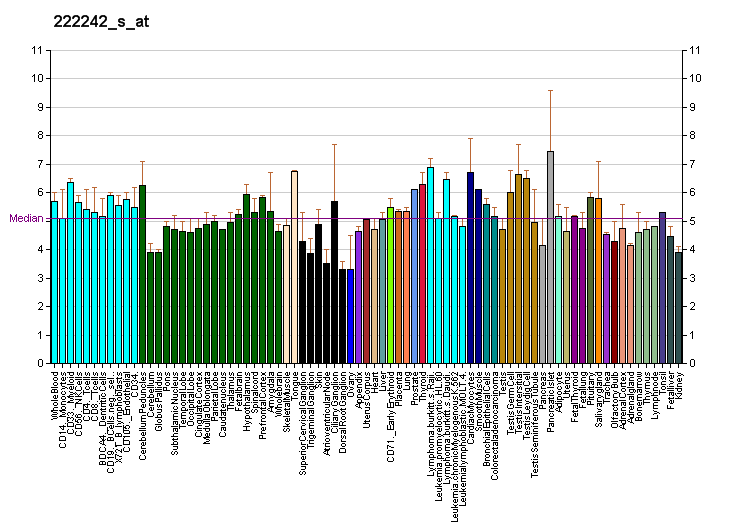
RNA expression pattern
Bgee	Human / Mouse (ortholog); Top expressed in: skin of arm; skin of leg; skin of abdomen; skin of thigh; human penis; skin of hip; vulva; gums; gingival epithelium; sperm / Top expressed in: lip; skin of external ear; skin of abdomen; skin of back; esophagus; umbilical cord; embryo; epidermis; blastocyst; condyle; More reference expression data
BioGPS	More reference expression data
Gene ontology
Molecular function	protein binding; hydrolase activity; peptidase activity; serine-type peptidase activity; endopeptidase activity; serine-type endopeptidase activity
Cellular component	epidermal lamellar body; extracellular region; extracellular space; cytosol; secretory granule
Biological process	positive regulation of antibacterial peptide production; positive regulation of G protein-coupled receptor signaling pathway; proteolysis; epidermis development; cornification; extracellular matrix disassembly; amelogenesis
Sources:Amigo / QuickGO
Orthologs
Databases	NCBI: entry; OMA: entry
Species	Human	Mouse
Entrez	25818	68668
Ensembl	ENSG00000167754	ENSMUSG00000074155
UniProt	Q9Y337	n/a
RefSeq (mRNA)	NM_001077491; NM_001077492; NM_012427	NM_026806
RefSeq (protein)	NP_001070959; NP_001070960; NP_036559	n/a
Location (UCSC)	Chr 19: 50.94 – 50.95 Mb	Chr 7: 43.49 – 43.5 Mb
PubMed search
- Wikidata
View/Edit Human	View/Edit Mouse

Kallikrein-5, formerly known as stratum corneum tryptic enzyme (SCTE), is a serine protease expressed in the epidermis. In humans it is encoded by the KLK5 gene. This gene is one of the fifteen kallikrein subfamily members located in a cluster on chromosome 19. Its expression is up-regulated by estrogens and progestins. Alternative splicing results in multiple transcript variants encoding the same protein.

KLK5 has been suggested to regulate cell shedding (desquamation) in conjunction with KLK7 and KLK14, given its ability to degrade proteins which form the extracellular component of cell junctions in the stratum corneum. It is proposed that KLK5 regulates this process since it is able to self-activate in addition to activating KLK7 and KLK14.
