= Kallikrein-1 =

Enzyme found in humans

KLK1
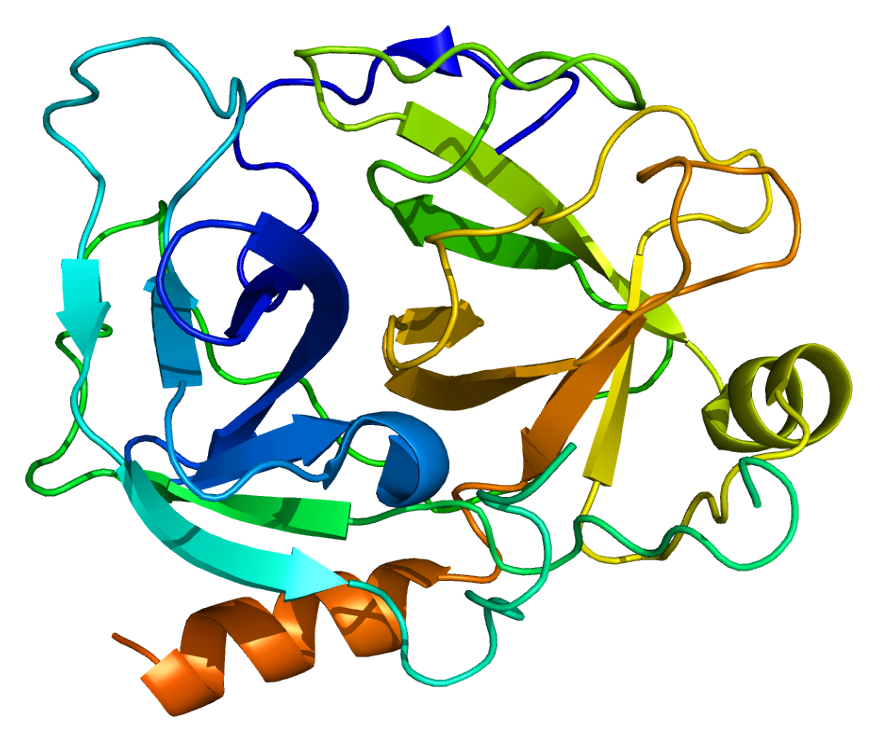

Identifiers
- Aliases: KLK1, KLKR, Klk6, hK1, kallikrein 1
- External IDs: OMIM: 147910; MGI: 102850; GeneCards: KLK1
Available structures
PDB	Ortholog search: PDBe RCSB
PDB	List of PDB id codes 1SPJ
Enzyme activity
EC #	BRENDA	ExPASy	KEGG	MetaCyc
3.4.21.35	↗	↗	↗	↗

Gene location (Human)
Chr.	Chromosome 19 (human)
Band	19q13.33	Start	50,819,146 bp
Band	19q13.33	End	50,823,787 bp

Gene location (Mouse)
Chr.	Chromosome 7 (mouse)
Band	7 B3|7 28.74 cM	Start	43,874,784 bp
Band	7 B3|7 28.74 cM	End	43,879,042 bp
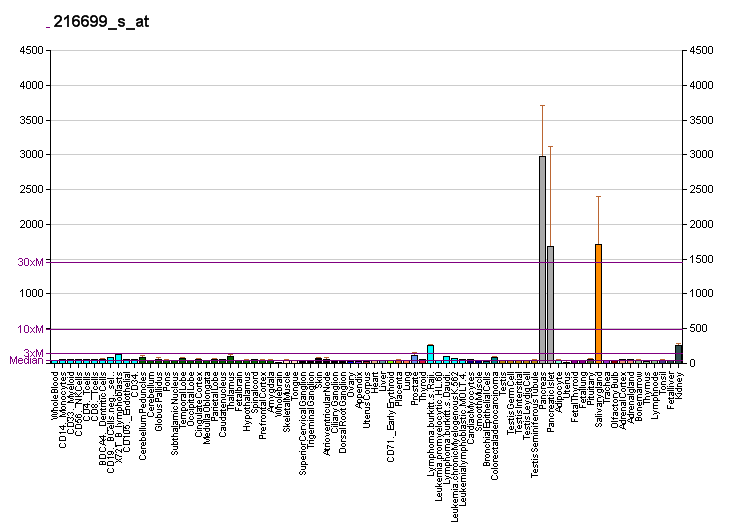
RNA expression pattern
Bgee	Human / Mouse (ortholog); Top expressed in: body of pancreas; mucosa of transverse colon; parotid gland; rectum; skin of abdomen; islet of Langerhans; skin of leg; beta cell; skin of arm; gonad / Top expressed in: submandibular gland; parotid gland; right kidney; left colon; human kidney; pyloric antrum; lacrimal gland; crypt of lieberkuhn of small intestine; duodenum; islet of Langerhans; More reference expression data
BioGPS	More reference expression data
Gene ontology
Molecular function	peptidase activity; serine-type peptidase activity; serine-type endopeptidase activity; hydrolase activity
Cellular component	extracellular exosome; nucleus; secretory granule
Biological process	proteolysis; regulation of systemic arterial blood pressure; zymogen activation
Sources:Amigo / QuickGO
Orthologs
Databases	NCBI: entry; OMA: entry
Species	Human	Mouse
Entrez	3816	16612
Ensembl	ENSG00000167748	ENSMUSG00000063903
UniProt	P06870	P15947
RefSeq (mRNA)	NM_002257	NM_010639; NM_001320331; NM_001320332
RefSeq (protein)	NP_002248	NP_001307260; NP_001307261; NP_034769
Location (UCSC)	Chr 19: 50.82 – 50.82 Mb	Chr 7: 43.87 – 43.88 Mb
PubMed search
- Wikidata
View/Edit Human	View/Edit Mouse

Kallikrein-1, also called tissue kallikrein, is an protein that in humans is encoded by the KLK1 gene. This enzyme acts on kininogen to produce Lys-bradykinin as part of the kinin–kallikrein system.

Kallikreins are a subgroup of serine proteases having diverse physiological functions. Growing evidence suggests that many kallikreins are implicated in carcinogenesis and some have potential as novel cancer and other disease biomarkers. This gene is one of the fifteen kallikrein subfamily members located in a cluster on chromosome 19. This protein is functionally conserved in its capacity to release the vasoactive peptide, Lys-bradykinin, from low molecular weight kininogen.

== Medical significance ==
A recombinant form of kallikrein-1, designated as DM199, is being tested as an experimental drug that acts on the kallikrein-kinin system and is developed for diabetes.

== See also ==
- Kininogen 1
