= Angioedema =

Disease characterized by rapid swelling

- Other names: Angioedema, Quincke's edema, angioneurotic edema
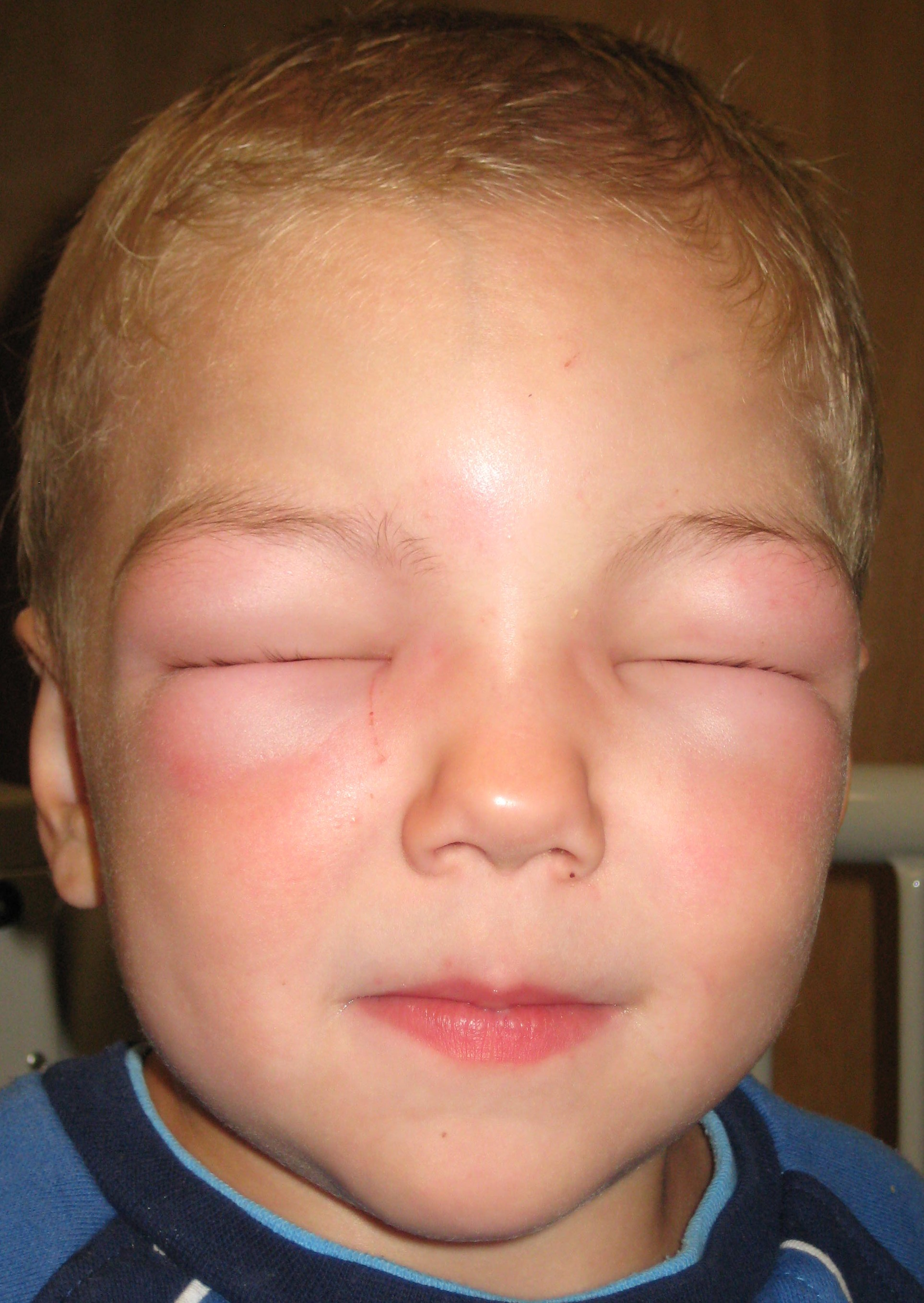
- Allergic angioedema: this child is unable to open his eyes due to the swelling.
- Specialty: Allergy and immunology, emergency medicine
- Symptoms: Area of swelling
- Usual onset: Minutes to hours
- Types: Histamine mediated, bradykinin mediated
- Risk factors: Family history
- Diagnostic method: Based on symptoms
- Differential diagnosis: Anaphylaxis, abscess, contact dermatitis
- Treatment: Intubation, cricothyroidotomy
- Medication: Histamine: antihistamines, corticosteroids, epinephrine Bradykinin: C1 esterase inhibitor, ecallantide, icatibant, fresh frozen plasma
- Frequency: ~100,000 per year (US)

Angioedema is an area of swelling (edema) of the lower layer of skin and tissue just under the skin or mucous membranes. The swelling may occur in the face, tongue, larynx, abdomen, or arms and legs. Often it is associated with hives, which are swelling within the upper skin. Onset is typically over minutes to hours.

The underlying mechanism typically involves histamine or bradykinin. The version related to histamine is due to an allergic reaction to agents such as insect bites, foods, or medications. The version related to bradykinin may occur due to an inherited problem known as C1 esterase inhibitor deficiency, medications known as angiotensin-converting enzyme inhibitors, or a lymphoproliferative disorder.

Treatment to protect the airway may include intubation or cricothyroidotomy. Histamine-related angioedema can be treated with antihistamines, corticosteroids, and epinephrine. In those with bradykinin-related disease a C1 esterase inhibitor, ecallantide, or icatibant may be used. Fresh frozen plasma may be used instead. In the United States the disease affects about 100,000 people a year.

== Signs and symptoms ==
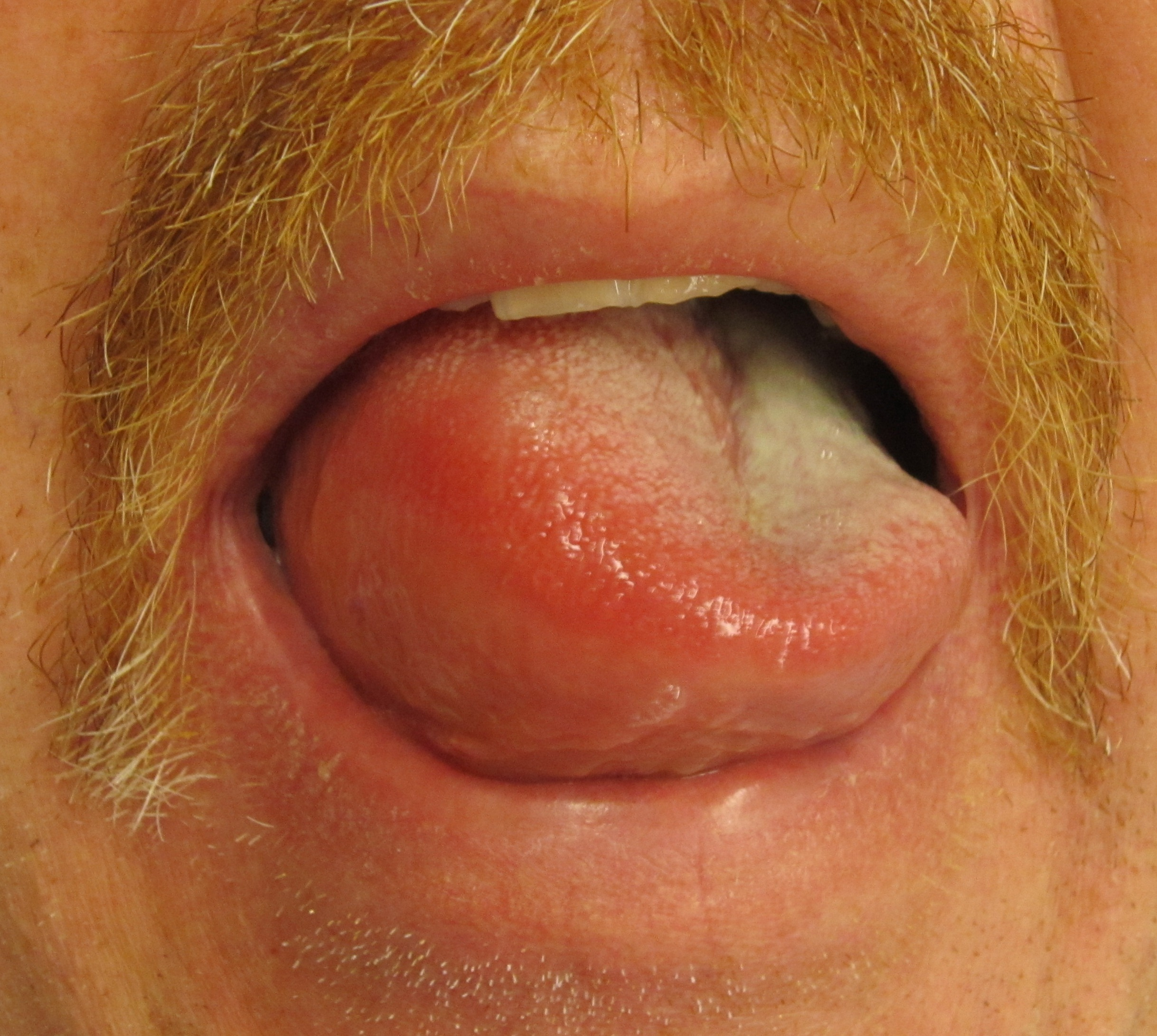
Angioedema of half of the tongue

Angioedema of the face, most strikingly in the upper lip.

The skin of the face, normally around the mouth, and the mucosa of the mouth and/or throat, as well as the tongue, swell over the period of minutes to hours. The swelling can also occur elsewhere, typically in the hands. The swelling can be accompanied by pain or a burning sensation. There may also be slightly decreased sensation in the affected areas due to compression of the nerves. Urticaria (hives) may develop simultaneously.

In severe cases, stridor of the airway occurs, with gasping or wheezy inspiratory breath sounds and decreasing oxygen levels. Tracheal intubation is required in these situations to prevent respiratory arrest and risk of death.

Sometimes, the cause is recent exposure to an allergen (e.g. peanuts), but more often it is either idiopathic (unknown) or only weakly correlated to allergen exposure.

In hereditary angioedema (HAE), often no direct cause is identifiable, although mild trauma, including dental work and other stimuli, can cause attacks. There is usually no associated itch or urticaria, as it is not an allergic response. Patients with HAE can also have recurrent episodes (often called "attacks") of abdominal pain, usually accompanied by intense vomiting, weakness, and in some cases, watery diarrhea, and an unraised, nonitchy splotchy/swirly rash. These stomach attacks can last one to five days on average and can require hospitalization for aggressive pain management and hydration. Abdominal attacks have also been known to cause a significant increase in the patient's white blood cell count, usually in the vicinity of 13,000 to 30,000. As the symptoms begin to diminish, the white count slowly begins to decrease, returning to normal when the attack subsides. As the symptoms and diagnostic tests are almost indistinguishable from an acute abdomen (e.g. perforated appendicitis) it is possible for undiagnosed HAE patients to undergo laparotomy (operations on the abdomen) or laparoscopy (keyhole surgery) that turns out to have been unnecessary.

HAE may also cause swelling in a variety of other locations, most commonly the limbs, genitals, neck, throat and face. The pain associated with these swellings varies from mildly uncomfortable to agonizing pain, depending on its location and severity. Predicting where and when the next episode of edema will occur is impossible. Most patients have an average of one episode per month, but there are also patients who have weekly episodes or only one or two episodes per year. The triggers can vary and include infections, minor injuries, mechanical irritation, operations or stress. In most cases, edema develops over a period of 12–36 hours and then subsides within 2–5 days.

== Pathophysiology ==
Bradykinin plays a critical role in all forms of hereditary angioedema. This peptide is a potent vasodilator and increases vascular permeability, leading to rapid accumulation of fluid in the interstitium. This is most obvious in the face, where the skin has relatively little supporting connective tissue, and edema develops easily. Bradykinin is released by various cell types in response to numerous different stimuli; it is also a pain mediator. Dampening or inhibiting bradykinin has been shown to relieve HAE symptoms.

Various mechanisms that interfere with bradykinin production or degradation can lead to angioedema. ACE inhibitors block ACE, the enzyme that among other actions, degrades bradykinin. In hereditary angioedema, bradykinin formation is caused by continuous activation of the complement system due to a deficiency in one of its prime inhibitors, C1-esterase (aka: C1-inhibitor or C1INH), and continuous production of kallikrein, another process inhibited by C1INH. This serine protease inhibitor (serpin) normally inhibits the association of C1r and C1s with C1q to prevent the formation of the C1-complex, which - in turn - activates other proteins of the complement system. Additionally, it inhibits various proteins of the coagulation cascade, although effects of its deficiency on the development of hemorrhage and thrombosis appear to be limited.

The three types of hereditary angioedema are:

- Type I - decreased levels of C1INH (85%);
- Type II - normal levels, but decreased function of C1INH (15%);
- Type III - no detectable abnormality in C1INH, occurs in an X-linked dominant fashion and therefore mainly affects women; it can be exacerbated by pregnancy and use of hormonal contraception (exact frequency uncertain). It has been linked with mutations in the factor XII gene.

Angioedema can be due to antibody formation against C1INH; this is an autoimmune disorder. This acquired angioedema is associated with the development of lymphoma.

Consumption of foods that are themselves vasodilators, such as alcoholic beverages or cinnamon, can increase the probability of an angioedema episode in susceptible patients. If the episode occurs at all after the consumption of these foods, its onset may be delayed overnight or by some hours, making the correlation with their consumption somewhat difficult. In contrast, consumption of bromelain in combination with turmeric may be beneficial in reducing symptoms.

The use of ibuprofen or aspirin may increase the probability of an episode in some patients. The use of acetaminophen typically has a smaller, but still present, increase in the probability of an episode.

== Diagnosis ==
The diagnosis is made on the clinical picture. Routine blood tests (complete blood count, electrolytes, kidney function, liver enzymes) are typically performed. Mast cell tryptase levels may be elevated if the attack was due to an acute allergic (anaphylactic) reaction. When the patient has been stabilized, particular investigations may clarify the exact cause; complement levels, especially depletion of complement factors 2 and 4, may indicate deficiency of C1-inhibitor. HAE type III is a diagnosis of exclusion consisting of observed angioedema along with normal C1 levels and function.

The hereditary form (HAE) often goes undetected for a long time, as its symptoms resemble those of more common disorders, such as allergy or intestinal colic. An important clue is the failure of hereditary angioedema to respond to antihistamines or steroids, a characteristic that distinguishes it from allergic reactions. It is particularly difficult to diagnose HAE in patients whose episodes are confined to the gastrointestinal tract. Besides a family history of the disease, only a laboratory analysis can provide final confirmation. In this analysis, it is usually a reduced complement factor C4, rather than the C1-INH deficiency itself, that is detected. The former is used during the reaction cascade in the complement system of immune defense, which is permanently overactive due to the lack of regulation by C1-INH.

Angioedema is classified as either hereditary or acquired.

=== Acquired angioedema ===
Acquired angioedema (AAE) can be immunologic, nonimmunologic, or idiopathic. It is usually caused by allergy and occurs together with other allergic symptoms and urticaria. It can also occur as a side effect to certain medications, particularly ACE inhibitors. It is characterized by repetitive episodes of swelling, frequently of the face, lips, tongue, limbs, and genitals. Edema of the gastrointestinal mucosa typically leads to severe abdominal pain; in the upper respiratory tract, it can be life-threatening.

=== Hereditary angioedema ===
Hereditary angioedema (HAE) exists in three forms, all of which are caused by a genetic mutation inherited in an autosomal dominant form. They are distinguished by the underlying genetic abnormality. Types I and II are caused by mutations in the SERPING1 gene, which result in either diminished levels of the C1-inhibitor protein (type I HAE) or dysfunctional forms of the same protein (type II HAE). Type III HAE has been linked with mutations in the F12 gene, which encodes the coagulation protein factor XII. All forms of HAE lead to abnormal activation of the complement system, and all forms can cause swelling elsewhere in the body, such as the digestive tract. If HAE involves the larynx, it can cause life-threatening asphyxiation. The pathogenesis of this disorder is suspected to be related to unopposed activation of the contact pathway by the initial generation of kallikrein and/or clotting factor XII by damaged endothelial cells. The end product of this cascade, bradykinin, is produced in large amounts and is believed to be the predominant mediator leading to increased vascular permeability and vasodilation that induces typical angioedema "attacks".

== Management ==
=== Allergic ===
In allergic angioedema, avoidance of the allergen and use of antihistamines may prevent future attacks. Cetirizine is a commonly prescribed antihistamine for angioedema. Some patients have reported success with the combination of a nightly low dose of cetirizine to moderate the frequency and severity of attacks, followed by a much higher dose when an attack does appear. Severe angioedema cases may require desensitization to the putative allergen, as mortality can occur. Chronic cases require steroid therapy, which generally leads to a good response. Allergic reactions can progress rapidly to anaphylaxis, which may be fatal without prompt treatment with epinephrine, commonly administer by an epinephrine auto-injector, such as an EpiPen.

=== Drug induced ===
==== ACE inhibitors ====
ACE inhibitors can induce angioedema. ACE inhibitors block the enzyme ACE so it can no longer degrade bradykinin; thus, bradykinin accumulates and can cause angioedema. This complication appears more common in African-Americans. Angioedema caused by ACE inhibitors may occur not-infrequently in patients who have been on the drug without side effects for years. It can be of any severity, including life-threatening presentations and may include involvement of the gastrointestinal mucosa.

In people with ACE inhibitor angioedema, the drug needs to be discontinued and an alternative treatment needs to be found, such as an angiotensin II receptor blocker (ARB), which has a similar mechanism but does not affect bradykinin. However, this is controversial, as small studies have shown some patients with ACE inhibitor angioedema can develop it with ARBs, as well. It is generally understood that in cases where angioedema does recur in patients switched to ARBs, the presentation is generally much more mild and not life threatening.

==== Other drugs ====
Drug-induced angioedema is rarely caused by any drug other than ACE inhibitors and other RAAS-affecting agents. Clinically significant angioedema is a known but rare drug reaction for therapeutic cytokines including recombinant IL-2 and IFN-α, and has been reported in association with omeprazole. Like angioedema caused by ACE inhibitors, discontinuing the offending drug is the method of treatment.

=== Hereditary ===
In hereditary angioedema (HAE), specific stimuli that have previously led to attacks may need to be avoided in the future. It does not respond to antihistamines, corticosteroids, or epinephrine. Acute treatment consists of C1-INH (C1-esterase inhibitor) concentrate from donor blood, which must be administered intravenously. In an emergency, fresh frozen blood plasma, which also contains C1-INH, can also be used. Previously, in most European countries, C1-INH concentrate was only available to patients who are participating in special programmes. The medications ecallantide and icatibant may be used to treat attacks. In 2017 these medications cost between 5,700 and 14,000 US$ per dose in the United States, prices that tripled in two years. In those given icatibant, specialists monitor is recommended.

=== Acquired, HAE types I and II, and nonhistaminergic ===
In acquired angioedema, HAE types I and II, and nonhistaminergic angioedema, antifibrinolytics such as tranexamic acid or ε-aminocaproic acid may be effective. Cinnarizine may also be useful because it blocks the activation of C4 and can be used in patients with liver disease, whereas androgens cannot.

=== Prophylaxis for HAE ===
Future attacks of HAE can be prevented by the use of androgens such as danazol, oxandrolone or methyltestosterone. These agents increase the level of aminopeptidase P, an enzyme that inactivates kinins; kinins (especially bradykinin) are responsible for the manifestations of angioedema.

In 2018, the U.S. Food and Drug Administration approved lanadelumab, an injectable monoclonal antibody, to prevent attacks of HAE types I and II in people over age 12. Lanadelumab inhibits the plasma enzyme kallikrein, which liberates the kinins bradykinin and kallidin from their kininogen precursors and is produced in excess in individuals with HAE types I and II.

== Epidemiology ==
In the U.S., there are as many as 80,000 to 112,000 emergency department (ED) visits for angioedema annually, and it ranks as the top allergic disorder resulting in hospitalization.

== History ==
Heinrich Quincke first described the clinical picture of angioedema in 1882, though there had been some earlier descriptions of the condition such as Marcellus Donato.

William Osler remarked in 1888 that some cases may have a hereditary basis; he coined the term "hereditary angio-neurotic edema".

The link with C1 esterase inhibitor deficiency was proved in 1963.

== See also ==
- Drug-induced angioedema
- Gleich's syndrome (unexplained angioedema with high eosinophil counts)
- Ruconest (C1-inhibitor)
