= Contact activation system =

Activation of coagulation cascade

The two arms of the contact system. PKa's cleavage of HK liberates BK and promotes inflammation. FXIIa's cleavage of FXI initiates coagulation.

In the contact activation system or CAS, three proteins in the blood, factor XII (FXII), prekallikrein (PK) and high molecular weight kininogen (HK), bind to a surface and cause blood coagulation and inflammation. FXII and PK are proteases and HK is a non-enzymatic co-factor. The CAS can activate the kinin–kallikrein system and blood coagulation through its ability to activate multiple downstream proteins. The CAS is initiated when FXII binds to a surface and reciprocal activation of FXII and PK occurs, forming FXIIa and PKa. FXIIa can initiate the coagulation cascade by cleaving and activating factor XI (FXI), which leads to formation of a blood clot. Additionally, the CAS can activate the kinin–kallikrein system when PKa cleaves HK to form cHK, releasing a peptide known as bradykinin (BK). BK and its derivatives bind to bradykinin receptors B1 and B2 to mediate inflammation.

== Surfaces and activation ==
Artificial negatively charged substances that activate FXII include L-homocysteine, heparan sulfates, chondroitin sulfates, dermatan sulfate, uric acid crystals, lipoproteins, ferritin and porphyrins. However, the physiological substances or surfaces that activate FXII are still under debate. These may include proteins, such as gC1q-R, aggregated proteins, amyloid, collagen, nucleic acids, and polyphosphates. The ability of FXII to bind to negatively charged surfaces and activate coagulation forms the basis of the aPTT test, in which artificial materials act as a surface for contact activation. This test is used to measure the contact activation pathway (intrinsic pathway) and the common pathway of clotting. FXII is a zymogen, which means that it requires processing to attain its catalytic protease activity. Upon binding to surfaces, FXII alters in its conformation, giving it low-level protease activity. This change in conformation also promotes its cleavage by PKa and cleavage by FXIIa itself. FXIIa can cleave PK producing PKa, producing a positive feed-back to activate both enzymes. HK binds to PK and is required to locate PK at the surface for activation by FXII.

Zinc has been reportedly demonstrated to be crucial in inducing a conformational change in both FXII and HK as it is required for assembly of FXII and HK bound PK on some negatively charged surfaces. Zinc is suggested to mediate binding of FXII and HK to negatively charged surfaces including gC1q-R and Polyphosphates.

== Contact factors binding to bacteria and viruses ==
Although contact factors FXII and HK bound PK have been reported to interact with endothelial cells (via gC1q-R), platelets (via Polyphosphate) and Leukocytes; bacteria (Streptococcus pyogenes, Salmonella, and Escherichia coli) and viruses (Hantavirus and Herpes simplex 1 virus) have also been demonstrated to bind to contact factors. Negatively charged lipopolysaccharide (LPS) or surface associated negatively charged teichoic acids from S. aureus and long chain Polyphosphate have all been shown to induce contact activation and bradykinin release thereby contributing to the host-defense reactions by activating the complement cascade.

== Physiological roles ==
Although the contact system can activate FXI and the subsequent clotting cascade, and it is routinely observed to activate coagulation in the presence of medical devices, the actual role of the contact system in normal physiological coagulation remains contentious. This is primarily due to the fact that deficiencies in the contact system proteins FXII, PK and HK do not produce bleeding disorders.

The contact activation system's physiological role in the kinin-kallikrein system is more clear. Here, after activation of PK to PKa by FXIIa, PKa cleaves HK. This produces cleaved HK (cHK), releasing a small peptide known as bradykinin. This peptide binds to bradykinin receptor B2 and its derivative, Des-Arg9-bradykinin binds to bradykinin receptor B1. Upon ligand binding, these receptors mediate inflammatory responses. PK can also lead to fibrinolysis by converting plasminogen to plasmin.

FXII can also lead to complement activation by directly targeting C1r and C1s. C1INH inhibits the action of PK, FXIIa, and FXIa, in addition to its classical inhibitory role for C1r and C1s.

== Roles in disease ==
Activation of the CAS is associated with hereditary angioedema, a disorder characterised by episodes of swelling. Genetic knockout studies in murine models of cardiovascular disease and genetic linkage studies in humans have implicated the contact factors in contributing to diverse cardiovascular disease processes including thrombosis and stroke.
