= Bernhard Nieswandt =

German biochemist

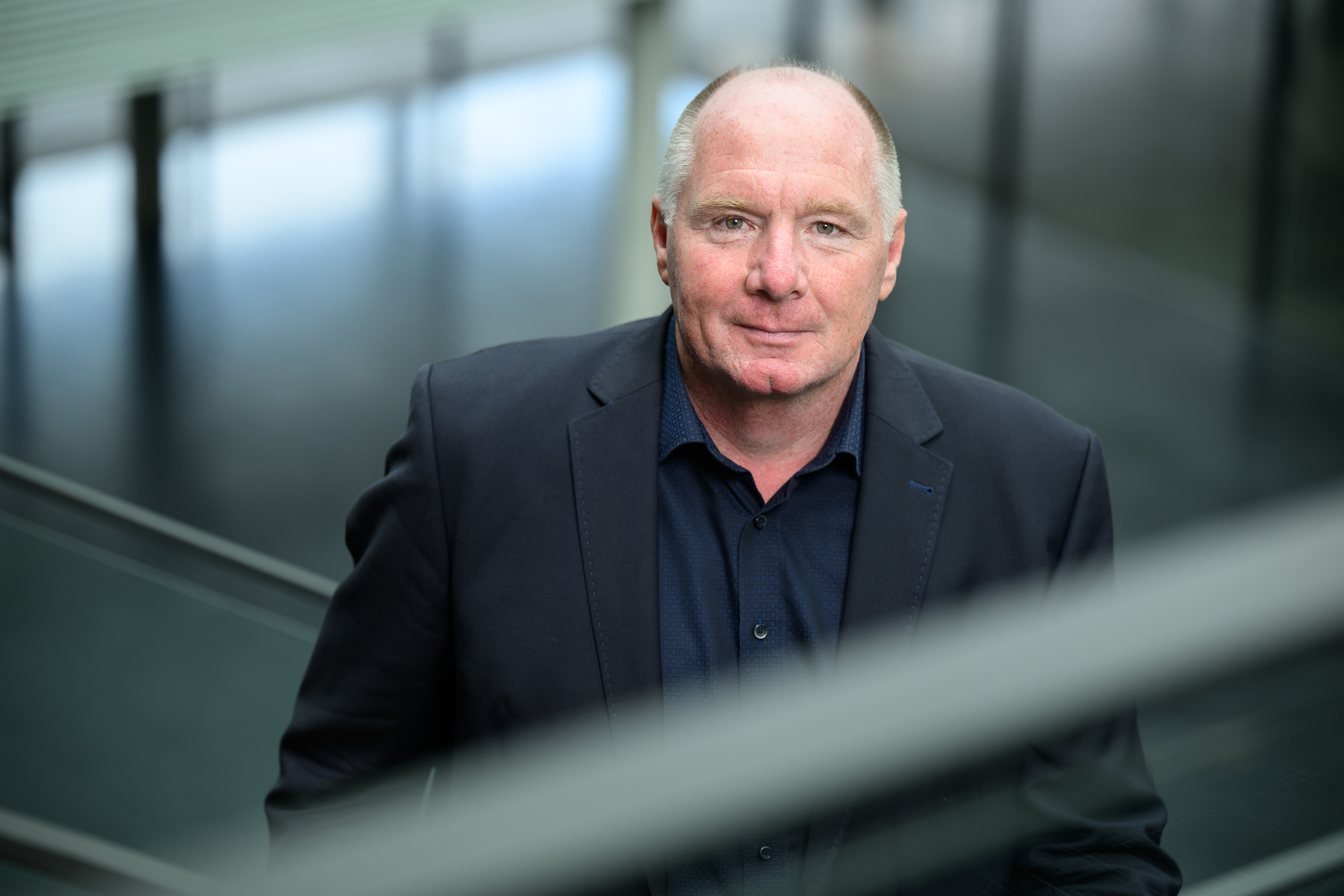
Bernhard Nieswandt (2024)

Bernhard Reiner Nieswandt (born July 9, 1968) is a German biochemist and cell biologist specializing in cardiovascular research, thrombosis, and hemostasis. He is a distinguished professor in the field of biomedicine and serves as the appointed Chair of Experimental Biomedicine at the Universitätsklinikum Würzburg. Additionally, he is a research group leader at the Rudolf Virchow Center in Würzburg.

== Life ==
Nieswandt studied biology and biochemistry in Regensburg, Germany, and Canterbury, UK, and earned his doctorate in 1997 at the Institute of Pathology/Tumor Immunology at the University of Regensburg. His dissertation discussed the role of platelets (thrombocytes) in tumor metastasis and inflammatory processes.

After completing his PhD, he moved to the Witten/Herdecke University, where he led the Molecular Oncology research group and completed his habilitation in Experimental Medicine in 2002. In the same year, he received a Heisenberg fellowship from the German Research Foundation (DFG) and relocated to Würzburg. There, he became part of the newly founded Rudolf Virchow Center, where he established its first research group. Also in 2002, he founded Emfret Analytics GmbH & Co KG, a company active in the production and distribution of monoclonal antibodies for research in vascular medicine.

In 2004, Nieswandt became a professor at the University of Würzburg, and in 2008, he was appointed chair of Experimental Biomedicine I.

From 2011 onward, he served as speaker of the Collaborative Research Center 688 on "Mechanisms and Imaging of Cell-Cell Interactions in the Cardiovascular System" at the University of Würzburg. In July 2018, he took over the leadership of a new Collaborative Research Center funded by the German Research Foundation, titled "Platelets – Molecular, Cellular, and Systemic Functions under Physiological and Pathological Conditions".

From 2016 to 2020, Nieswandt served as Vice Dean of the Medical Faculty and, during the same period, co-directed the Rudolf Virchow Center alongside Caroline Kisker. He had previously been a member of the center's board.

== Scientific research ==
Nieswandt investigates the formation and function of blood platelets (thrombocytes) and their role in hemostasis, as well as in the development of thrombotic diseases such as heart attack, stroke, or pulmonary embolism. His primary research focus is on surface receptors and signal transduction mechanisms in platelets, with the goal of developing new pharmacological approaches for the prevention and treatment of thrombotic and inflammatory diseases. In 2001, he was the first to describe the central role of the collagen/fibrin receptor glycoprotein VI (GPVI) in the formation of arterial thrombosis. He also discovered that therapeutic inhibition of this receptor is possible and can provide long-lasting protection against heart attacks and strokes without significantly affecting normal hemostasis. These findings laid the foundation for the development of GPVI inhibitors, which are in clinical development and testing.

Together with physician Thomas Renné, he discovered in 2005 that blocking coagulation factor XII (FXII, Hageman factor) in mice prevents the formation of blood clots, thereby reducing the risk of secondary complications such as strokes and heart attacks while leaving hemostasis unaffected. Based on these findings, an experimental FXIIa inhibitor (rHA-Infestin-4) was initially developed, which proved to be an effective anticoagulant in mice. Building on this, a therapeutic FXIIa-blocking antibody (Garadacimab, CSL Behring) was developed, which has been approved since December 2023 for the treatment of hereditary angioedema.

Furthermore, he and his team identified the cause of inflammatory reactions in the brain following an ischemic stroke, which are triggered by platelets, and developed the concept of "thrombo-inflammation" as a central pathomechanism in a variety of diseases. Similar platelet-induced immune overreactions were also observed in COVID-19 patients. Nieswandt's research group demonstrated that inhibiting the receptors GPIb or GPVI on the surface of platelets dampens thrombo-inflammatory processes and reduces associated tissue damage.

In 2024, Nieswandt received an ERC Advanced Grant of 2.5 million euros for his research on blood platelets. The project funded by this grant investigates the effects of platelets on the immune system and inflammatory processes in the body.

== Publications (selection) ==
Nieswandt has published more than 320 papers since 1999. As of 2025, his H-index was 93.

- Nieswandt, B., Hafner, M., Echtenacher, B., & Männel, D. N. (1999). Lysis of tumor cells by natural killer cells in mice is impeded by platelets. Cancer Research, 59, 1295–1300. PMID 10096562.
- Nieswandt, B., Schulte, V., Bergmeier, W., Mokhtari-Nejad, R., Rackebrandt, K., Cazenave, J. P., Ohlmann, P., Gachet, C., & Zirngibl, H. (2001). Long-term antithrombotic protection by in vivo depletion of platelet glycoprotein VI in mice. Journal of Experimental Medicine, 193, 459–469. doi:10.1084/jem.193.4.459.
- Nieswandt, B., & Watson, S. P. (2003). Platelet-collagen interaction: Is GPVI the central receptor? Blood, 102(2), 449–461. doi:10.1182/blood-2002-12-3882.
- Renné, T., Pozgajová, M., Grüner, S., Schuh, K., Pauer, H. U., Burfeind, P., Gailani, D., & Nieswandt, B. (2005). Defective thrombus formation in mice lacking coagulation factor XII. Journal of Experimental Medicine, 202, 271–281. doi:10.1084/jem.20050664.
- Kleinschnitz, C., Pozgajova, M., Pham, M., Bendszus, M., Nieswandt, B., & Stoll, G. (2007). Targeting platelets in acute experimental stroke: Impact of glycoprotein Ib, VI, and IIb/IIIa blockade on infarct size, functional outcome, and intracranial bleeding. Circulation, 115, 2323–2330. doi:10.1161/CIRCULATIONAHA.107.691279.
- Moser, M., Nieswandt, B., Ussar, S., Požgajová, M., & Fässler, R. (2008). Kindlin-3 is essential for integrin activation and platelet aggregation. Nature Medicine, 14, 325–330. doi:10.1038/nm1722.
- Nieswandt, B., Kleinschnitz, C., & Stoll, G. (2011). Ischaemic stroke: A thrombo-inflammatory disease? Journal of Physiology, 589, 4115–4123. doi:10.1113/jphysiol.2011.212886.
- Stoll, G., & Nieswandt, B. (2019). Thrombo-inflammation in acute ischaemic stroke – Implications for treatment. Nature Reviews Neurology, 15(8), 473–481. doi:10.1038/s41582-019-0221-1.
- Stegner, D., Göb, V., Krenzlin, V., Beck, S., Hemmen, K., Schuhmann, M. K., Schörg, B. F., Hackenbroch, C., May, F., Burkard, P., Pinnecker, J., Zernecke, A., Rosenberger, P., Greinacher, A., Pichler, B. J., Heinze, K. G., Stoll, G., & Nieswandt, B. (2022). Foudroyant cerebral venous (sinus) thrombosis triggered through CLEC-2 and GPIIb/IIIa dependent platelet activation. Nature Cardiovascular Research, 1, 132–141. doi:10.1038/s44161-021-00017-1.
- Beck, S., Öftering, P., Li, R., Hemmen, K., Nagy, M., Wang, Y., Zarpellon, A., Schuhmann, M. K., Stoll, G., Ruggeri, Z. M., Heinze, K. G., Heemskerk, J. W. M., Ruf, W., Stegner, D., & Nieswandt, B. (2023). Platelet glycoprotein V spatiotemporally controls fibrin formation. Nature Cardiovascular Research, 2, 368–382. doi:10.1038/s44161-023-00254-6.
- Navarro, S., Talucci, I., Göb, V., Hartmann, S., Beck, S., Orth, V., Stoll, G., Maric, H. M., Stegner, D., & Nieswandt, B. (2024). The humanised platelet glycoprotein VI Fab inhibitor EMA601 protects from arterial thrombosis and ischaemic stroke in mice. European Heart Journal. doi:10.1093/eurheartj/ehae482.

== Awards (Selection) ==
- 2002: Heisenberg Fellowship of the DFG
- 2008: Alexander-Schmitt Prize of the Society for Thrombosis and Haemostasis Research (GTH)
- 2008: GlaxoSmithKline Award of the GSK Foundation
- 2013: Biennial Award for Contributions to Hemostasis (BACH) of the International Society on Thrombosis and Haemostasis (ISTH)
- 2022: Preis der Deutschen Hochschulmedizin (Prize of the German University Medicine) as part of the winning VITT team
- 2024: ERC Advanced Grant of the European Research Council
