= BMN 331 =

Experimental gene therapy

BMN 331 is an experimental gene therapy for hereditary angioedema, delivered by adeno-associated virus type 5 and targeting the SERPING1 gene.
