= BioCryst Pharmaceuticals =

American pharmaceutical company

BioCryst Pharmaceuticals, Inc.
- Type: Public
- Traded as: Nasdaq: BCRX; Russell 2000 Component
- Industry: Healthcare
- Founded: 1986; 40 years ago
- Headquarters: Durham, North Carolina, US
- Key people: Charlie Gayer (president and CEO)
- Products: ORLADEYO, RAPIVAB
- Revenue: ▲$874.9 million (2025)
- Number of employees: 450
- Website: www.biocryst.com

BioCryst Pharmaceuticals, Inc. is an American pharmaceutical company headquartered in Durham, North Carolina. The company is a commercial stage biotech company that focuses on developing and commercializing medicines for hereditary angioedema (HAE) and other rare diseases. BioCryst's antiviral drug peramivir (Rapivab) was approved by the FDA in December 2014 and berotralstat (ORLADEYO) was approved in December 2020.

== History ==
The company was founded in 1986 by Charles E. Bugg and John A. Montgomery. In March 1994, BioCryst became a public company when it completed an initial public offering by listing its shares on the NASDAQ stock exchange. In 2008, the company was named one of the fastest growing companies by Deloitte & Touche in its 2008 list of Technology Fast 500.

In October 2010, BioCryst announced its headquarters would move to Durham, North Carolina, where the company has had an office since 2006. In January 2018, BioCryst signed a definitive merger agreement with Idera Pharmaceuticals, with plans for the combined company to change its name and move to Pennsylvania. However, BioCryst shareholders voted down the merger in July.

== Pipeline ==
BioCryst’s core development programs include:

- Berotralstat (BCX7353), an oral inhibitor of plasma kallikrein for prevention and treatment of hereditary angioedema (HAE).
  - FDA has approved Expanded Access Program for berotralstat for eligible patients in the United States.
  - Berotralstat has a PDUFA date for FDA approval on December 3, 2020.
  - On December 3, 2020, the FDA approved berotralstat as the first oral hereditary angioedema prophylaxis.
- BCX9930, an oral Factor D inhibitor for the treatment of complement-mediated diseases.
  - FDA has granted Fast Track designation for BCX9930, for the treatment of paroxysmal nocturnal hemoglobinuria (PNH).
- BCX9250, an oral ALK-2 inhibitor for treatment of fibrodysplasia ossificans progressiva (FOP).
- Galidesivir (BCX4430) is a broad-spectrum antiviral in advanced development for the treatment of viruses including SARS-CoV-2 (the cause of COVID-19), Ebola, Marburg, Yellow Fever and Zika.
  - Galidesivir was safe and generally well tolerated in Phase 1 clinical safety and pharmacokinetics trials conducted in 2019 by both intravenous and intramuscular routes of administration in healthy human subjects.
  - In animal studies, galidesivir has demonstrated survival benefits against a variety of serious pathogens, including Ebola, Marburg, Yellow Fever and Zika viruses.
  - BioCryst is developing galidesivir in collaboration with U.S. government agencies and other institutions.
  - In September 2013, NIAID contracted with BioCryst for the development of galidesivir as a treatment for Marburg virus disease and potentially for other filoviruses, including Ebola virus.
  - In March 2015, BioCryst announced that the Biomedical Advanced Research and Development Authority (BARDA) within the U.S. Department of Health & Human Services’ Office of the Assistant Secretary for Preparedness and Response (ASPR) has awarded BioCryst a contract for the continued development of galidesivir as a potential treatment for diseases caused by RNA pathogens, including filoviruses.
  - In April 2020, BioCryst began enrollment of a randomized, double-blind, placebo-controlled clinical trial to assess the safety, clinical impact and antiviral effects of galidesivir in patients with COVID-19. This clinical trial is (NCT03891420) is being funded by the National Institute of Allergy and Infectious Diseases (NIAID), part of the National Institutes of Health. The company later made the decision to cease conducting further trials.
