= Sebetralstat =

Chemical compound

Clinical data
- Trade names: Ekterly
- Other names: KVD-900, KVD900
- AHFS/Drugs.com: Monograph
- MedlinePlus: a625087
- License data: US DailyMed: Sebetralstat
- Routes of administration: By mouth
- Drug class: Plasma kallikrein inhibitor
- ATC code: B06AC08 (WHO)

Legal status
- Legal status: US: ℞-only; EU: Rx-only

Identifiers
- IUPAC name: N-[(3-fluoro-4-methoxypyridin-2-yl)methyl]-3-(methoxymethyl)-1-[[4-[(2-oxopyridin-1-yl)methyl]phenyl]methyl]pyrazole-4-carboxamide
- CAS Number: 1933514-13-6
- PubChem CID: 121365142
- IUPHAR/BPS: 11947
- DrugBank: DB18305
- ChemSpider: 115006749
- UNII: O5ZD2TU2B7
- KEGG: D12396
- ChEMBL: ChEMBL5095248

Chemical and physical data
- Formula: C_{26}H_{26}FN_{5}O_{4}
- Molar mass: 491.523 g·mol^{−1}
- 3D model (JSmol): Interactive image
- SMILES: COCC1=NN(C=C1C(=O)NCC2=NC=CC(=C2F)OC)CC3=CC=C(C=C3)CN4C=CC=CC4=O
- InChI: InChI=1S/C26H26FN5O4/c1-35-17-22-20(26(34)29-13-21-25(27)23(36-2)10-11-28-21)16-32(30-22)15-19-8-6-18(7-9-19)14-31-12-4-3-5-24(31)33/h3-12,16H,13-15,17H2,1-2H3,(H,29,34); Key:KGMPDQIYDKKXRD-UHFFFAOYSA-N

Sebetralstat, sold under the brand name Ekterly, is a medication used for the treatment of hereditary angioedema. Sebetralstat is a plasma kallikrein inhibitor that suppresses the activation of the positive feedback mechanism of the kallikrein-kinin system, thereby reducing factor XIIa and additional plasma kallikrein production. By inhibiting plasma kallikrein, sebetralstat reduces the production of bradykinin, thereby halting the progression of hereditary angioedema attacks. It is taken by mouth.

The most common side effect is headache.

Sebetralstat was approved for medical use in the United States in July 2025, and in the European Union in September 2025.

== Medical uses ==
Sebetralstat is indicated for the treatment of acute attacks of hereditary angioedema.

== Pharmacology ==
Sebetralstat is a plasma kallikrein inhibitor that contains the unusual 2-pyridone heterocycle.

== History ==
The US Food and Drug Administration (FDA) approved sebetralstat based on evidence from a clinical trial (KONFIDENT) that enrolled 110 participants with hereditary angioedema type I or II. The trial was conducted at 66 sites in 20 countries, including Australia, Bulgaria, Canada, France, Germany, Greece, Hungary, Israel, Italy, Japan, Netherlands, New Zealand, North Macedonia, Poland, Portugal, Romania, Slovakia, Spain, the United Kingdom, and the United States. In the study, participants tried three different treatments in random order: sebetralstat 600 mg, sebetralstat 300 mg, and a placebo (inactive pill that looks like the real medicine). The main goal of the study was to measure how quickly sebetralstat started working. Researchers tracked how long it took for people to feel at least "a little better" twice in a row within twelve hours of taking their first dose.

== Society and culture ==
=== Legal status ===
Sebetralstat was approved for medical use in the United States in July 2025. The US Food and Drug Administration granted the application for sebetralstat orphan drug designation.

In July 2025, the Committee for Medicinal Products for Human Use of the European Medicines Agency adopted a positive opinion, recommending the granting of a marketing authorization for the medicinal product Ekterly, intended for the symptomatic treatment of acute attacks of hereditary angioedema in people aged twelve years of age and older. The applicant for this medicinal product is KalVista Pharmaceuticals (Ireland) Ltd. Hereditary angioedema is a rare, chronic, genetic, debilitating, and potentially life-threatening disorder characterized by recurrent and often unpredictable attacks of swelling in many parts of the body. This is the first oral treatment for hereditary angioedema recommended for approval in the European Union. Sebetralstat was authorized for medical use in the European Union in September 2025.

=== Names ===
Sebetralstat is the international nonproprietary name.

Sebetralstat is sold under the brand name Ekterly.
