= Donidalorsen =

Medication

Clinical data
- Trade names: Dawnzera
- Other names: ISIS 721744, ISIS-721744
- AHFS/Drugs.com: Monograph
- MedlinePlus: a625098
- License data: US DailyMed: Donidalorsen
- Routes of administration: Subcutaneous
- ATC code: B06AC09 (WHO)

Legal status
- Legal status: US: ℞-only; EU: Rx-only

Identifiers
- IUPAC name: all-P-ambo-5'-O-(((6-(5-((tris(3-(6-(2-acetamido-2-deoxy-β-D-galactopyranosyloxy)hexylamino)-3-oxopropoxymethyl))methyl)amino-5-oxopentanamido)hexyl))phospho)-2'-O-(2-methoxyethyl)-5-methyl-P-thiouridylyl-(3'→5')-2'-O-(2-methoxyethyl)-P-thioguanylyl-(3'→5')-2'-O-(2-methoxyethyl)-5-methylcytidylyl-(3'→5')-2'-O-(2-methoxyethyl)adenylyl-(3'→5')-2'-O-(2-methoxyethyl)-P-thioadenylyl-(3'→5')-2'-deoxy-P-thioguanylyl-(3'→5')-P-thiothymidylyl-(3'→5')-2'-deoxy-5-methyl-P-thiocytidylyl-(3'→5')-P-thiothymidylyl-(3'→5')-2'-deoxy-5-methyl-P-thiocytidylyl-(3'→5')-P-thiothymidylyl-(3'→5')-P-thiothymidylyl-(3'→5')-2'-deoxy-P-thioguanylyl-(3'→5')-2'-deoxy-P-thioguanylyl-(3'→5')-2'-deoxy-5-methyl-P-thiocytidylyl-(3'→5')-2'-O-(2-methoxyethyl)adenylyl-(3'→5')-2'-O-(2-methoxyethyl)adenylyl-(3'→5')-2'-O-(2-methoxyethyl)-P-thioadenylyl-(3'→5')-2'-O-(2-methoxyethyl)-5-methyl-P-thiocytidylyl-(3'→5')-2'-O-(2-methoxyethyl)adenosine
- CAS Number: 2304692-48-4; 2304701-45-7
- DrugBank: DB18751; DBSALT003520
- UNII: ZD4D8M32TL; Y30VEG5PH1
- KEGG: D13154

Chemical and physical data
- Formula: C_{296}H_{435}N_{83}O_{151}P_{20}S_{15}
- Molar mass: 8672.54 g·mol^{−1}
- 3D model (JSmol): Interactive image
- SMILES: COCCO[C@@H]1[C@H](OP(=O)(O)OC[C@H]2O[C@@H](n3cnc4c(N)ncnc43)[C@H](OCCOC)[C@@H]2OP(=O)(O)OC[C@H]2O[C@@H](n3cnc4c(N)ncnc43)[C@H](OCCOC)[C@@H]2OP(O)(=S)OC[C@H]2O[C@@H](n3cnc4c(=O)[nH]c(N)nc43)C[C@@H]2OP(O)(=S)OC[C@H]2O[C@@H](n3cc(C)c(=O)[nH]c3=O)C[C@@H]2OP(O)(=S)OC[C@H]2O[C@@H](n3cc(C)c(N)nc3=O)C[C@@H]2OP(O)(=S)OC[C@H]2O[C@@H](n3cc(C)c(=O)[nH]c3=O)C[C@@H]2OP(O)(=S)OC[C@H]2O[C@@H](n3cc(C)c(N)nc3=O)C[C@@H]2OP(O)(=S)OC[C@H]2O[C@@H](n3cc(C)c(=O)[nH]c3=O)C[C@@H]2OP(O)(=S)OC[C@H]2O[C@@H](n3cc(C)c(=O)[nH]c3=O)C[C@@H]2OP(O)(=S)OC[C@H]2O[C@@H](n3cnc4c(=O)[nH]c(N)nc43)C[C@@H]2OP(O)(=S)OC[C@H]2O[C@@H](n3cnc4c(=O)[nH]c(N)nc43)C[C@@H]2OP(O)(=S)OC[C@H]2O[C@@H](n3cc(C)c(N)nc3=O)C[C@@H]2OP(O)(=S)OC[C@H]2O[C@@H](n3cnc4c(N)ncnc43)[C@H](OCCOC)[C@@H]2OP(=O)(O)OC[C@H]2O[C@@H](n3cnc4c(N)ncnc43)[C@H](OCCOC)[C@@H]2OP(=O)(O)OC[C@H]2O[C@@H](n3cnc4c(N)ncnc43)[C@H](OCCOC)[C@@H]2OP(O)(=S)OC[C@H]2O[C@@H](n3cc(C)c(N)nc3=O)[C@H](OCCOC)[C@@H]2OP(O)(=S)OC[C@H]2O[C@@H](n3cnc4c(N)ncnc43)[C@H](OCCOC)[C@@H]2O)[C@@H](COP(O)(=S)O[C@H]2[C@@H](OCCOC)[C@H](n3cnc4c(=O)[nH]c(N)nc43)O[C@@H]2COP(O)(=S)O[C@H]2[C@@H](OCCOC)[C@H](n3cc(C)c(=O)[nH]c3=O)O[C@@H]2COP(=O)(O)OCCCCCCNC(=O)CCCC(=O)NC(COCCC(=O)NCCCCCCO[C@@H]2O[C@H](CO)[C@H](O)[C@H](O)[C@H]2NC(C)=O)(COCCC(=O)NCCCCCCO[C@@H]2O[C@H](CO)[C@H](O)[C@H](O)[C@H]2NC(C)=O)COCCC(=O)NCCCCCCO[C@@H]2O[C@H](CO)[C@H](O)[C@H](O)[C@H]2NC(C)=O)O[C@H]1n1cc(C)c(N)nc1=O
- InChI: InChI=1S/C296H435N83O151P20S15/c1-139-87-360(286(407)341-239(139)297)190-77-152(513-537(428,552)477-104-169-156(81-194(493-169)364-93-145(7)261(399)355-292(364)413)516-540(431,555)478-105-170-158(83-196(494-170)366-95-147(9)263(401)357-294(366)415)517-541(432,556)481-107-172-160(85-198(496-172)371-130-335-210-257(371)347-283(309)351-266(210)404)520-544(435,559)482-108-173-159(84-197(497-173)370-129-334-209-256(370)346-282(308)350-265(209)403)519-542(433,557)479-102-167-154(79-192(491-167)362-89-141(3)241(299)343-288(362)409)518-545(436,560)485-116-182-223(233(459-71-61-446-18)275(507-182)376-135-331-206-247(305)319-126-325-253(206)376)525-533(421,422)471-113-177-221(232(458-70-60-445-17)274(504-177)375-134-330-205-246(304)318-125-324-252(205)375)523-535(425,426)473-115-180-226(237(463-75-65-450-22)277(506-180)378-137-333-208-249(307)321-128-327-255(208)378)528-550(441,565)487-118-183-227(235(461-73-63-448-20)271(502-183)368-91-143(5)243(301)345-290(368)411)529-547(438,562)484-110-175-216(394)229(455-67-57-442-14)269(499-175)373-132-328-203-244(302)316-123-322-250(203)373)165(489-190)100-474-538(429,553)514-155-80-193(363-92-144(6)260(398)354-291(363)412)492-168(155)103-476-536(427,551)512-153-78-191(361-88-140(2)240(298)342-287(361)408)490-166(153)101-475-539(430,554)515-157-82-195(365-94-146(8)262(400)356-293(365)414)495-171(157)106-480-543(434,558)521-161-86-199(372-131-336-211-258(372)348-284(310)352-267(211)405)498-174(161)109-483-546(437,561)527-225-179(505-276(236(225)462-74-64-449-21)377-136-332-207-248(306)320-127-326-254(207)377)114-472-534(423,424)522-220-176(503-273(231(220)457-69-59-444-16)374-133-329-204-245(303)317-124-323-251(204)374)112-470-532(419,420)524-222-181(501-270(230(222)456-68-58-443-15)367-90-142(4)242(300)344-289(367)410)117-486-548(439,563)530-228-184(508-278(238(228)464-76-66-451-23)379-138-337-212-259(379)349-285(311)353-268(212)406)119-488-549(440,564)526-224-178(500-272(234(224)460-72-62-447-19)369-96-148(10)264(402)358-295(369)416)111-469-531(417,418)468-53-39-31-27-35-46-312-185(386)41-40-42-189(390)359-296(120-452-54-43-186(387)313-47-32-24-28-36-50-465-279-200(338-149(11)383)217(395)213(391)162(97-380)509-279,121-453-55-44-187(388)314-48-33-25-29-37-51-466-280-201(339-150(12)384)218(396)214(392)163(98-381)510-280)122-454-56-45-188(389)315-49-34-26-30-38-52-467-281-202(340-151(13)385)219(397)215(393)164(99-382)511-281/h87-96,123-138,152-184,190-202,213-238,269-281,380-382,391-397H,24-86,97-122H2,1-23H3,(H,312,386)(H,313,387)(H,314,388)(H,315,389)(H,338,383)(H,339,384)(H,340,385)(H,359,390)(H,417,418)(H,419,420)(H,421,422)(H,423,424)(H,425,426)(H,427,551)(H,428,552)(H,429,553)(H,430,554)(H,431,555)(H,432,556)(H,433,557)(H,434,558)(H,435,559)(H,436,560)(H,437,561)(H,438,562)(H,439,563)(H,440,564)(H,441,565)(H2,297,341,407)(H2,298,342,408)(H2,299,343,409)(H2,300,344,410)(H2,301,345,411)(H2,302,316,322)(H2,303,317,323)(H2,304,318,324)(H2,305,319,325)(H2,306,320,326)(H2,307,321,327)(H,354,398,412)(H,355,399,413)(H,356,400,414)(H,357,401,415)(H,358,402,416)(H3,308,346,350,403)(H3,309,347,351,404)(H3,310,348,352,405)(H3,311,349,353,406)/t152-,153-,154-,155-,156-,157-,158-,159-,160-,161-,162+,163+,164+,165+,166+,167+,168+,169+,170+,171+,172+,173+,174+,175+,176+,177+,178+,179+,180+,181+,182+,183+,184+,190+,191+,192+,193+,194+,195+,196+,197+,198+,199+,200+,201+,202+,213-,214-,215-,216+,217+,218+,219+,220+,221+,222+,223+,224+,225+,226+,227+,228+,229+,230+,231+,232+,233+,234+,235+,236+,237+,238+,269+,270+,271+,272+,273+,274+,275+,276+,277+,278+,279+,280+,281+,536?,537?,538?,539?,540?,541?,542?,543?,544?,545?,546?,547?,548?,549?,550?/m0/s1; Key:OHKXUCDSZDEIHM-ADAMUUMMSA-N

Donidalorsen, sold under the brand name Dawnzera, is a medication used to prevent attacks of hereditary angioedema. Donidalorsen is a prekallikrein-directed antisense oligonucleotide. It is given by injection under the skin (subcutaneous).

Donidalorsen was approved for medical use in the United States in August 2025, and in the European Union in January 2026. The US Food and Drug Administration considers it to be a first-in-class medication.

== Medical uses ==
Donidalorsen is indicated for prophylaxis to prevent attacks of hereditary angioedema.

== Mechanism of action ==
Donidalorsen is an antisense oligonucleotide designed to treat hereditary angioedema (HAE) by targeting and reducing the production of prekallikrein (PKK), a key protein involved in triggering inflammatory mediators responsible for HAE attacks. It works by binding to the messenger RNA (mRNA) of the KLKB1 gene, which encodes prekallikrein, and promoting the breakdown of this mRNA. As a result, the synthesis of PKK protein is decreased. Lower PKK levels reduce the downstream production of bradykinin, a potent vasodilator implicated in the swelling episodes characteristic of HAE. Through this RNA-targeted mechanism, donidalorsen lowers the frequency and severity of angioedema attacks by interrupting the pathway responsible for excessive bradykinin generation.

== Society and culture ==
=== Legal status ===
Donidalorsen was approved for medical use in the United States in August 2025.

In November 2025, the Committee for Medicinal Products for Human Use of the European Medicines Agency adopted a positive opinion, recommending the granting of a marketing authorization for the medicinal product Dawnzera, intended for the routine prevention of recurrent attacks of hereditary angioedema in adults and adolescents aged twelve years of age and older. The applicant for this medicinal product is Otsuka Pharmaceutical Netherlands B.V. Donidalorsen was authorized for medical use in the European Union in January 2026.

=== Names ===
Donidalorsen is the international nonproprietary name.

Donidalorsen is sold under the brand name Dawnzera.
