= Ecallantide =

Medication

Clinical data
- Trade names: Kalbitor
- Other names: DX-88
- AHFS/Drugs.com: Monograph
- License data: US DailyMed: Ecallantide; US FDA: Ecallantide
- Routes of administration: Subcutaneous injection
- ATC code: B06AC03 (WHO)

Legal status
- Legal status: US: ℞-only

Pharmacokinetic data
- Elimination half-life: 1.5–2.5 hours
- Excretion: Kidney

Identifiers
- IUPAC name: [Glu^{20},Ala^{21},Arg^{36},Ala^{38},His^{39},Pro^{40},Trp^{42}]tissue factor pathway inhibitor (human)-(20-79)-peptide (modified on reactive bond region Kunitz inhibitor 1 domain containing fragment)
- CAS Number: 460738-38-9
- PubChem CID: 118984459
- IUPHAR/BPS: 6955
- DrugBank: DB05311
- ChemSpider: 34983390
- UNII: 5Q6TZN2HNM
- ChEMBL: ChEMBL1201837
- CompTox Dashboard (EPA): DTXSID90196709

Chemical and physical data
- Formula: C_{305}H_{442}N_{88}O_{91}S_{8}
- Molar mass: 7053.90 g·mol^{−1}

Ecallantide (trade name Kalbitor) is a drug used for the treatment of hereditary angioedema (HAE) and in the prevention of blood loss in cardiothoracic surgery. It is an inhibitor of the protein kallikrein and a 60-amino acid polypeptide which was developed from a Kunitz domain through phage display to mimic antibodies inhibiting kallikrein.

== Medical uses ==
=== Angioedema ===
On November 27, 2009, ecallantide was approved by the FDA for the treatment of acute attacks of hereditary angioedema for persons over 16 years of age. A single dose requires three separate injections, which are given under the skin.

Ecallantide does not appear to be efficacious for the treatment of angioedema due to ACE inhibitors.

== Adverse effects ==
The most common adverse effects are headache, nausea, fatigue and diarrhea. Less common, but observed in more than 5% of patients in clinical trials, are respiratory tract infections, fever, vomiting, itching and upper abdominal pain. Up to 4% of patients showed anaphylaxis, which led to a black box warning in the US.

== Interactions ==
As of 2011, no interaction studies have been conducted.

== Mechanism of action ==
HAE is caused by a mutation of the C1-inhibitor gene. Defective or missing C1-inhibitor permits activation of kallikrein, a protease that is responsible for liberating bradykinin from its precursor kininogen. An excess of bradykinin leads to fluid leakage from blood vessels, causing swelling of tissues typical of HAE.

Ecallantide suppresses this pathogenetic mechanism by selectively and reversibly inhibiting the activity of plasma kallikrein. Ecallantide's inhibitory constant (Ki) for kallikrein is 25 picoMolar, indicating high affinity.
