= Drug-induced angioedema =

- Other names: Acquired angioedema
- Specialty: Dermatology

Drug-induced angioedema is a known complication of the use of angiotensin-converting enzyme (ACE) inhibitors, angiotensin II antagonists (ARBs), and some neprilysin inhibitors. The angioedema appears to be dose dependent as it may resolve with decreased dose.

== Presentation ==
Angioedema presents itself as an abrupt onset of non-pitting, non-itchy swelling that involves the mucosal layers. Some common locations of angioedema are the face, particularly the lips and around the eyes, hands and feet, and genitalia. A rare, yet serious complication is one inside the abdomen, the symptom usually being severe stomach upset, which is much less obvious than the other locations.

== Risk factor ==
Some common ACE Inhibitors are:

- Benazepril (Lotensin)
- Captopril (Capoten)
- Enalapril (Vasotec)
- Lisinopril (Prinivil, Zestril)
- Ramipril (Altace)

Some common ARBs are:

- Candesartan (Atacand)
- Losartan (Cozaar)
- Olmesartan (Benicar)
- Valsartan (Diovan)

== Incidence ==
Cases of drug-induced angioedema are uncommon, with studies showing an incidence of less than 1%. The reason this adverse effect may occur is due to the build-up of bradykinin, a vasodilator. This causes blood vessels to dilate and allows for fluid buildup in the mucosal surfaces.

== See also ==
- Angioedema
- Skin lesion
