= Crizanlizumab =

Monoclonal antibody

Monoclonal antibody
- Type: Whole antibody
- Source: Humanized
- Target: selectin P

Clinical data
- Trade names: Adakveo
- Other names: SEG101, SelG1, crizanlizumab-tmca
- AHFS/Drugs.com: Monograph
- MedlinePlus: a620010
- License data: US DailyMed: Crizanlizumab
- Pregnancy category: AU: B1
- Routes of administration: Intravenous
- ATC code: B06AX01 (WHO)

Legal status
- Legal status: AU: S4 (Prescription only); US: ℞-only; EU: Rx-only

Identifiers
- CAS Number: 1690318-25-2
- DrugBank: DB15271
- ChemSpider: none
- UNII: L7451S9126
- KEGG: D11480

Chemical and physical data
- Formula: C_{6458}H_{9948}N_{1712}O_{2050}S_{58}
- Molar mass: 146232.04 g·mol^{−1}

Crizanlizumab, sold under the brand name Adakveo among others, is a monoclonal antibody medication that binds to P-selectin. It is a medication used to reduce the frequency of vaso-occlusive crisis in people aged 16 years and older who have sickle cell anemia. It is given by injection into a vein.

The most common side effects include joint pain, nausea, back pain, fever and abdominal (belly) pain.

Crizanlizumab was approved for medical use in the United States in November 2019. The EU's EMA withdrew authorization in May 2023 based on no significant effects from a phase 3 trial. The U.S. Food and Drug Administration (FDA) considers it to be a first-in-class medication.

== Medical uses ==
Crizanlizumab is indicated for the prevention of recurrent vaso occlusive crises in sickle cell disease patients aged 16 years and older. It can be given as an add on therapy to hydroxyurea/hydroxycarbamide (HU/HC) or as monotherapy in patients for whom HU/HC is inappropriate or inadequate.

Vaso-occlusive crisis is a common and painful complication of sickle cell disease that occurs when blood circulation is obstructed by sickled red blood cells (red cells are usually round and flexible, but sometimes many red cells in a person with sickle cell anemia will become rigid and crescent-shaped due to polymerization of hemoglobin).

== Pathophysiology ==
P-selectin molecules are present on the surface of activated platelets and vascular endothelial cells and have been linked to sickle cell vaso-occlusive crises.

== History ==
The US Food and Drug Administration (FDA) approved crizanlizumab based on evidence from one clinical trial (Trial 1/NCT01895361) of 132 participants with sickle cell diseases who had a history of vaso-occlusive crisis. The trial was conducted at 60 sites in the United States, Brazil and Jamaica.

The FDA granted the application for crizanlizumab priority review, breakthrough therapy designation, and orphan drug designation. The FDA granted approval of Adakveo to Novartis.

The European Medicines Agency's human medicines committee (CHMP) has recommended the withdrawal of Adakveo (crizanlizumab), a medicine for preventing vaso-occlusive crises in patients with sickle cell disease, due to the lack of sufficient benefits outweighing the risks. The STAND phase III study showed that Adakveo does not effectively reduce the number of painful crises requiring healthcare visits or treatment at home compared to a placebo, and it exhibits a higher rate of severe side effects.
