= ATC code B06 =

ATC code B06 Other hematological agents is a therapeutic subgroup of the Anatomical Therapeutic Chemical Classification System, a system of alphanumeric codes developed by the World Health Organization (WHO) for the classification of drugs and other medical products. Subgroup B06 is part of the anatomical group B Blood and blood forming organs.

Codes for veterinary use (ATCvet codes) can be created by placing the letter Q in front of the human ATC code: for example, QB06.
National versions of the ATC classification may include additional codes not present in this list, which follows the WHO version.

== B06A Other hematological agents ==
=== B06AA Enzymes ===
B06AA02 Fibrinolysin and desoxyribonuclease
B06AA03 Hyaluronidase
B06AA04 Chymotrypsin
B06AA07 Trypsin
B06AA10 Desoxyribonuclease
B06AA55 Streptokinase, combinations

=== B06AB Heme products ===
B06AB01 Hemin

=== B06AC Drugs used in hereditary angioedema ===
B06AC01 C1-inhibitor, plasma derived
B06AC02 Icatibant
B06AC03 Ecallantide
B06AC04 Conestat alfa
B06AC05 Lanadelumab
B06AC06 Berotralstat
B06AC07 Garadacimab
B06AC08 Sebetralstat
B06AC09 Donidalorsen

=== B06AX Other hematological agents ===
B06AX01 Crizanlizumab
B06AX02 Betibeglogene autotemcel
B06AX03 Voxelotor
B06AX04 Mitapivat
B06AX05 Exagamglogene autotemcel
B06AX06 Lovotibeglogene autotemcel
B06AX07 Mozafancogene autotemcel
