= Berotralstat =

Medication

Clinical data
- Trade names: Orladeyo
- Other names: BCX7353, BCX-7353
- AHFS/Drugs.com: Monograph
- License data: US DailyMed: Berotralstat
- Routes of administration: By mouth
- Drug class: Plasma kallikrein inhibitor
- ATC code: B06AC06 (WHO)

Legal status
- Legal status: CA: ℞-only; US: ℞-only; EU: Rx-only

Identifiers
- IUPAC name: 2-[3-(aminomethyl)phenyl]-N-[5-[(R)-(3-cyanophenyl)-(cyclopropylmethylamino)methyl]-2-fluorophenyl]-5-(trifluoromethyl)pyrazole-3-carboxamide
- CAS Number: 1809010-50-1; as HCl: 1809010-52-3
- PubChem CID: 137528262
- DrugBank: DB15982
- ChemSpider: 81368516
- UNII: XZA0KB1BDQ; as HCl: 88SH1NBL2B
- KEGG: D11673; as HCl: D11674
- CompTox Dashboard (EPA): DTXSID401336676

Chemical and physical data
- Formula: C_{30}H_{26}F_{4}N_{6}O
- Molar mass: 562.573 g·mol^{−1}
- 3D model (JSmol): Interactive image
- SMILES: NCC1=CC(=CC=C1)N1N=C(C=C1C(=O)NC1=CC(=CC=C1F)[C@H](NCC1CC1)C1=CC=CC(=C1)C#N)C(F)(F)F
- InChI: InChI=1S/C30H26F4N6O/c31-24-10-9-22(28(37-17-18-7-8-18)21-5-1-3-19(11-21)15-35)13-25(24)38-29(41)26-14-27(30(32,33)34)39-40(26)23-6-2-4-20(12-23)16-36/h1-6,9-14,18,28,37H,7-8,16-17,36H2,(H,38,41)/t28-/m1/s1; Key:UXNXMBYCBRBRFD-MUUNZHRXSA-N

Berotralstat, sold under the brand name Orladeyo, is a medication used to prevent attacks of hereditary angioedema. Berotralstat is a plasma kallikrein inhibitor. It is taken by mouth.

The most common side effects include abdominal pain, vomiting, diarrhea, back pain, and heartburn.

Berotralstat was approved for medical use in the United States in December 2020, and in the European Union in April 2021.

== Medical uses ==
Berotralstat is indicated for prophylaxis to prevent attacks of hereditary angioedema.

== History ==
Berotralstat was approved based on evidence from one clinical trial (Trial 1 / NCT03485911) of 120 participants with hereditary angioedema. The trial was conducted at 40 sites in the United States, the European Union, and Canada. Trial investigators evaluated participants twelve years of age and older with hereditary angioedema for eight weeks to determine the number of attacks for each participant. The trial enrolled only participants who had at least two attacks during the eight-week period. Participants were assigned to receive one of two doses of berotralstat or placebo once every day for 24 weeks. Neither the participants nor the investigators knew which treatment was being given until after the trial was completed. All participants could use other medications for treatment of attacks.

== Society and culture ==
=== Legal status ===
Berotralstat was approved for medical use in the United States in December 2020, and in the European Union in April 2021.

=== Names ===
Berotralstat is the international nonproprietary name.
