= Garadacimab =

Medication

Monoclonal antibody
- Type: Whole antibody
- Source: Human
- Target: Coagulation factor XIIa

Clinical data
- Trade names: Andembry
- Other names: CSL-312, garadacimab-gxii
- AHFS/Drugs.com: Monograph
- MedlinePlus: a625083
- License data: US DailyMed: Garadacimab
- Routes of administration: Subcutaneous
- Drug class: Bleeding suppressant
- ATC code: B06AC07 (WHO)

Legal status
- Legal status: AU: S4 (Prescription only); CA: ℞-only / Schedule D; UK: POM (Prescription only); US: ℞-only; EU: Rx-only

Identifiers
- CAS Number: 2162134-62-3
- DrugBank: DB15629
- UNII: 32W6AJL0DY
- KEGG: D12613

Chemical and physical data
- Formula: C_{6470}H_{10004}N_{1724}O_{2022}S_{42}
- Molar mass: 145639.77 g·mol^{−1}

Garadacimab, sold under the brand name Andembry, is a human monoclonal antibody used for the treatment of hereditary angioedema. Garadacimab is a monoclonal antibody against the activated coagulation factor XIIa (FXIIa), with potential anti-inflammatory and anticoagulant activities.

Garadacimab is a fully human, recombinant, IgG4 lambda monoclonal antibody that binds to the catalytic domain of activated factor XII (FXIIa). FXIIa is the first factor activated in the contact system, which leads to the production of bradykinin. The inhibition of FXIIa therefore prevents the activation of prekallikrein into kallikrein and the generation of bradykinin, which is associated with inflammation and swelling in attacks of hereditary angioedema.

Garadacimab was authorized for medical use in the European Union in February 2025, and approved in the United States in June 2025. The US Food and Drug Administration considers it to be a first-in-class medication.

== Medical uses ==
Garadacimab is indicated for routine prevention of recurrent attacks of hereditary angioedema in people aged twelve years of age and older.

== Society and culture ==
=== Legal status ===
In December 2024, the Committee for Medicinal Products for Human Use of the European Medicines Agency adopted a positive opinion, recommending the granting of a marketing authorization for the medicinal product Andembry, intended for the prevention of recurrent attacks of hereditary angioedema. The applicant for this medicinal product is CSL Behring GmbH. Garadacimab was designated an orphan medicine by the EMA. Garadacimab was authorized for medical use in the European Union in February 2025.

Garadacimab was approved for medical use in the United States in June 2025.

=== Names ===
Garadacimab is the international nonproprietary name.

Garadacimab is sold under the brand name Andembry.
