= Bradykinin receptor B2 =

Protein found in humans

BDKRB2

Identifiers
- Aliases: BDKRB2, B2R, BK-2, BK2, BKR2, BRB2, bradykinin receptor B2
- External IDs: OMIM: 113503; MGI: 102845; GeneCards: BDKRB2

Gene location (Human)
Chr.	Chromosome 14 (human)
Band	14q32.2	Start	96,204,679 bp
Band	14q32.2	End	96,244,166 bp

Gene location (Mouse)
Chr.	Chromosome 12 (mouse)
Band	12 E|12 55.76 cM	Start	105,529,485 bp
Band	12 E|12 55.76 cM	End	105,561,496 bp
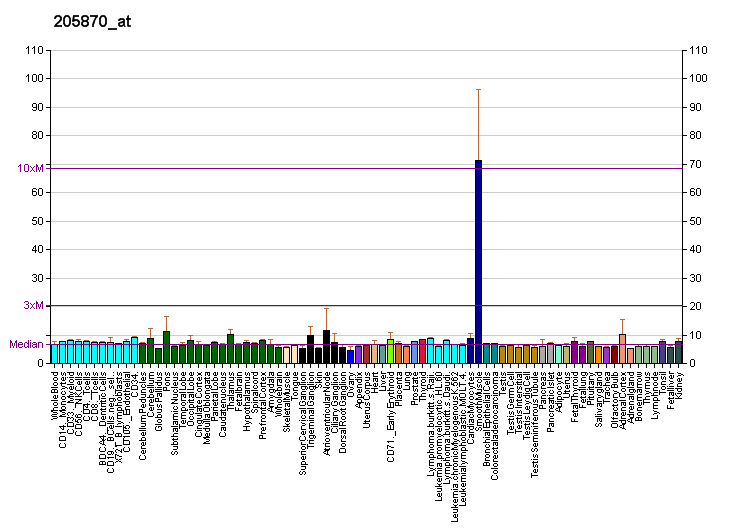
RNA expression pattern
Bgee	Human / Mouse (ortholog); Top expressed in: stromal cell of endometrium; mucosa of urinary bladder; pancreatic ductal cell; tendon of biceps brachii; gums; cartilage tissue; gingival epithelium; gallbladder; ectocervix; canal of the cervix / Top expressed in: esophagus; embryo; embryo; adrenal gland; pituitary gland; lip; duodenum; placenta; muscle of thigh; ileum; More reference expression data
BioGPS	More reference expression data
Gene ontology
Molecular function	G protein-coupled receptor activity; type 1 angiotensin receptor binding; signal transducer activity; protease binding; protein binding; protein heterodimerization activity; phosphatidylinositol phospholipase C activity; bradykinin receptor activity
Cellular component	integral component of membrane; endosome; membrane; integral component of plasma membrane; plasma membrane
Biological process	G protein-coupled receptor signaling pathway; negative regulation of intrinsic apoptotic signaling pathway in response to osmotic stress; response to salt stress; vasoconstriction; transmembrane receptor protein tyrosine kinase signaling pathway; response to stress; negative regulation of intrinsic apoptotic signaling pathway in response to osmotic stress by p53 class mediator; vasodilation; blood circulation; cell surface receptor signaling pathway; regulation of vascular permeability; regulation of vasoconstriction; negative regulation of peptidyl-serine phosphorylation; inflammatory response; arachidonic acid secretion; signal transduction; smooth muscle contraction; positive regulation of cytosolic calcium ion concentration
Sources:Amigo / QuickGO
Orthologs
Databases	NCBI: entry; OMA: entry
Species	Human	Mouse
Entrez	624	12062
Ensembl	ENSG00000168398	ENSMUSG00000021070
UniProt	P30411	P32299
RefSeq (mRNA)	NM_000623; NM_001379692	NM_009747
RefSeq (protein)	NP_000614; NP_001366621	NP_033877
Location (UCSC)	Chr 14: 96.2 – 96.24 Mb	Chr 12: 105.53 – 105.56 Mb
PubMed search
- Wikidata
View/Edit Human	View/Edit Mouse

Bradykinin receptor B2 is a G-protein coupled receptor for bradykinin, encoded by the BDKRB2 gene in humans.

== Mechanism ==
The B2 receptor (B2R) is a G protein-coupled receptor, probably coupled to G_{q} and G_{i}. A 2022 Nature cryo-EM study of human B2R-G_{q} complexes by Jinkeng Sheng et al. investigated the proximal activation mechanisms of B2R. Sheng et al. propose that upon B2R binding bradykinin or kallidin to a "bulky orthosteric binding pocket," the phenylalanine F8 or F9 residue of bradykinin or kallidin respectively interacts with a "conserved toggle switch" W283. This hydrophobic interaction facilitates the outward movement of transmembrane domain 6 (TM6) of B2R on the cytoplasmic side of the membrane, as well as outward movement of F279, a key residue within the conserved PIF motif of GPCRs (involving proline, isoleucine and phenylalanine). This rearrangement of the PIF motif disrupts the ionic lock formed by the DRY motif and pushes the NPxxY motif towards the activated state, opening an "intracellular cleft" for insertion of the α5-helix of G_{q}.

G_{q} stimulates phospholipase C to increase intracellular free calcium and G_{i} inhibits adenylate cyclase. Furthermore, the receptor stimulates the mitogen-activated protein kinase pathways. It is ubiquitously and constitutively expressed in healthy tissues.

The B2 receptor forms a complex with angiotensin converting enzyme (ACE), and this is thought to play a role in cross-talk between the renin-angiotensin system (RAS) and the kinin–kallikrein system (KKS). The heptapeptide angiotensin (1-7) also potentiates bradykinin action on B2 receptors.

Kallidin also signals through the B2 receptor. Antagonists for the receptor are Hoe 140/icatibant), Deucrictibant.

== Function ==
The 9 amino acid bradykinin peptide elicits several responses including vasodilation, edema, smooth muscle spasm and nociceptor stimulation.

== Gene ==
Alternate start codons result in two isoforms of the protein.

== See also ==
- Bradykinin receptor
