= Icatibant =

Pharmaceutical drug

Clinical data
- Trade names: Firazyr
- Other names: Hoe 140, JE 049
- AHFS/Drugs.com: Monograph
- License data: US DailyMed: Icatibant
- Pregnancy category: AU: C
- Routes of administration: Subcutaneous
- ATC code: B06AC02 (WHO)

Legal status
- Legal status: AU: S4 (Prescription only); US: ℞-only; EU: Rx-only; In general: ℞ (Prescription only)

Identifiers
- IUPAC name: (2S)-2-[[(2S,3aS,7aS)-1-[(3R)-2-[(2S)-2-[[(2S)-2-[[2-[[(2S,4R)-1-[(2S)-1-[(2S)-2-[[(2R)-2-amino-5-(diaminomethylideneamino)pentanoyl]amino]-5-(diaminomethylideneamino)pentanoyl]pyrrolidine-2-carbonyl]-4-hydroxypyrrolidine-2-carbonyl]amino]acetyl]amino]-3-thiophen-2-ylpropanoyl]amino]-3-hydroxypropanoyl]-3,4-dihydro-1H-isoquinoline-3-carbonyl]-2,3,3a,4,5,6,7,7a-octahydroindole-2-carbonyl]amino]-5-(diaminomethylideneamino)pentanoic acid
- CAS Number: 130308-48-4
- PubChem CID: 6918173
- IUPHAR/BPS: 667
- DrugBank: DB06196
- ChemSpider: 16736634
- UNII: 7PG89G35Q7
- KEGG: as salt: D04492
- ChEBI: CHEBI:68556
- ChEMBL: ChEMBL1743581
- CompTox Dashboard (EPA): DTXSID20903963

Chemical and physical data
- Formula: C_{59}H_{89}N_{19}O_{13}S
- Molar mass: 1304.54 g·mol^{−1}
- 3D model (JSmol): Interactive image
- SMILES: C1CC[C@H]2[C@@H](C1)C[C@H](N2C(=O)[C@H]3CC4=CC=CC=C4CN3C(=O)[C@H](CO)NC(=O)[C@H](CC5=CC=CS5)NC(=O)CNC(=O)[C@@H]6C[C@H](CN6C(=O)[C@@H]7CCCN7C(=O)[C@H](CCCN=C(N)N)NC(=O)[C@@H](CCCN=C(N)N)N)O)C(=O)N[C@@H](CCCN=C(N)N)C(=O)O
- InChI: InChI=1S/C59H89N19O13S/c60-37(14-5-19-67-57(61)62)48(82)72-38(15-6-20-68-58(63)64)52(86)75-22-8-18-43(75)54(88)77-30-35(80)26-44(77)50(84)70-28-47(81)71-40(27-36-13-9-23-92-36)49(83)74-41(31-79)53(87)76-29-34-12-2-1-10-32(34)24-46(76)55(89)78-42-17-4-3-11-33(42)25-45(78)51(85)73-39(56(90)91)16-7-21-69-59(65)66/h1-2,9-10,12-13,23,33,35,37-46,79-80H,3-8,11,14-22,24-31,60H2,(H,70,84)(H,71,81)(H,72,82)(H,73,85)(H,74,83)(H,90,91)(H4,61,62,67)(H4,63,64,68)(H4,65,66,69)/t33-,35+,37+,38-,39-,40-,41-,42-,43-,44-,45-,46+/m0/s1; Key:QURWXBZNHXJZBE-SKXRKSCCSA-N

Icatibant, sold under the brand name Firazyr, is a medication for the symptomatic treatment of acute attacks of hereditary angioedema (HAE) in adults with C1-esterase-inhibitor deficiency. It is not effective in angioedema caused by medication from the ACE inhibitor class.

It is a peptidomimetic consisting of ten amino acids, which is a selective and specific antagonist of bradykinin B_{2} receptors.

== Mechanism of action ==
Bradykinin is a peptide-based hormone that is formed locally in tissues, very often in response to a trauma. It increases vessel permeability, dilates blood vessels and causes endotelial cells to contract. Bradykinin plays an important role as the mediator of pain. Surplus bradykinin is responsible for the typical symptoms of inflammation, such as swelling, redness, overheating and pain. These symptoms are mediated by activation of bradykinin B_{2} receptors. Icatibant acts as a bradykinin inhibitor by blocking the binding of native bradykinin to the bradykinin B_{2} receptor. Little is known about the effects of icatibant on the bradykinin B_{1} receptor.

== Society and culture ==
=== Legal status ===
Icatibant received orphan drug status in Australia, the EU, Switzerland, and the US for the treatment of hereditary angioedema (HAE).

In the EU, the approval by the European Commission (July 2008) allows Jerini to market Firazyr in the European Union's 27 member states, as well as Switzerland, Liechtenstein and Iceland, making it the first product to be approved in all EU countries for the treatment of hereditary angioedema. In the US, the drug was granted FDA approval in August 2011.
