= SERPING1 =

Mammalian protein found in humans

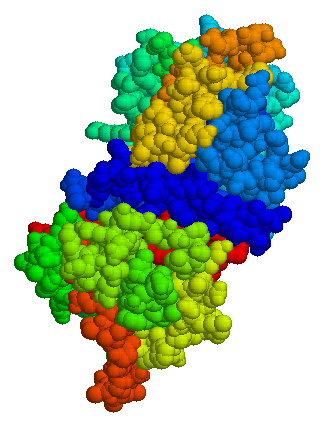

Identifiers
- Aliases: SERPING1, C1IN, C1INH, C1NH, HAE1, HAE2, serpin family G member 1
- External IDs: OMIM: 606860; MGI: 894696; GeneCards: SERPING1
Available structures
PDB	Ortholog search: PDBe RCSB
PDB	List of PDB id codes 2OAY

Gene location (Human)
Chr.	Chromosome 11 (human)
Band	11q12.1	Start	57,597,387 bp
Band	11q12.1	End	57,619,171 bp

Gene location (Mouse)
Chr.	Chromosome 2 (mouse)
Band	2|2 D	Start	84,595,731 bp
Band	2|2 D	End	84,605,788 bp
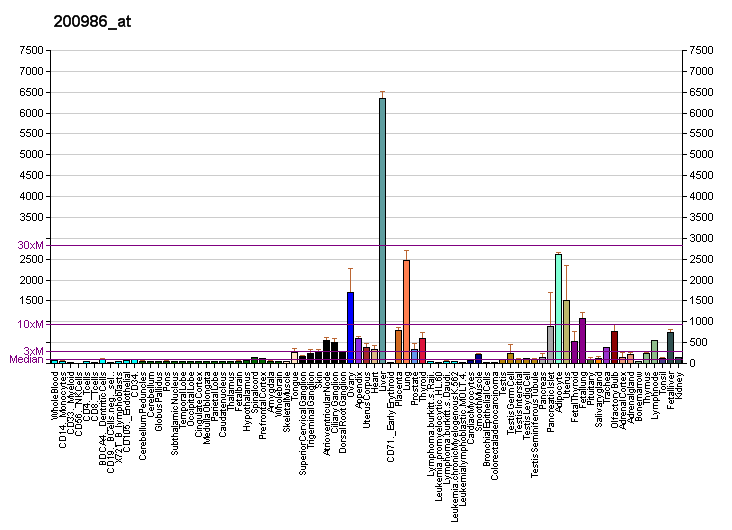
RNA expression pattern
Bgee	Human / Mouse (ortholog); Top expressed in: right lobe of liver; right lung; right coronary artery; gastric mucosa; Descending thoracic aorta; ascending aorta; popliteal artery; tibial arteries; left uterine tube; right ovary / Top expressed in: left lobe of liver; gastrula; carotid body; decidua; ankle; right lung; right lung lobe; efferent ductule; white adipose tissue; uterus; More reference expression data
BioGPS	More reference expression data
Gene ontology
Molecular function	peptidase inhibitor activity; protein binding; serine-type endopeptidase inhibitor activity
Cellular component	blood microparticle; extracellular region; extracellular exosome; platelet alpha granule lumen; extracellular space; collagen-containing extracellular matrix
Biological process	hemostasis; blood coagulation, intrinsic pathway; negative regulation of peptidase activity; fibrinolysis; immune system process; ageing; platelet degranulation; blood circulation; negative regulation of complement activation, lectin pathway; complement activation, classical pathway; innate immune response; negative regulation of endopeptidase activity; blood coagulation; regulation of complement activation; regulation of blood coagulation; negative regulation of complement activation
Sources:Amigo / QuickGO
Orthologs
Databases	NCBI: entry; OMA: entry
Species	Human	Mouse
Entrez	710	12258
Ensembl	ENSG00000149131	ENSMUSG00000023224
UniProt	P05155	P97290
RefSeq (mRNA)	NM_001032295; NM_000062	NM_009776
RefSeq (protein)	NP_000053; NP_001027466	NP_033906
Location (UCSC)	Chr 11: 57.6 – 57.62 Mb	Chr 2: 84.6 – 84.61 Mb
PubMed search
- Wikidata
View/Edit Human	View/Edit Mouse

C1-inhibitor (C1-inh, C1 esterase inhibitor) is a protease inhibitor that in humans is encoded by the SERPING1 gene. Its main function is the inhibition of the complement system (C1r, C1s) to prevent spontaneous activation but also as the major regulator of the contact system (PK, FXIIa, and FXIa).

== Proteomics ==
C1-inhibitor is the largest member among the serpin superfamily of proteins. It can be noted that, unlike most family members, C1-inhibitor has a 2-domain structure. The C-terminal serpin domain is similar to other serpins, which is the part of C1-inhibitor that provides the inhibitory activity. The N-terminal domain (also some times referred to as the N-terminal tail) is not essential for C1-inhibitor to inhibit proteases. This domain has no similarity to other proteins. C1-inhibitor is highly glycosylated, bearing both N- and O-glycans. N-terminal domain is especially heavily glycosylated.

== Role in disease ==
Deficiency of this protein is associated with hereditary angioedema ("hereditary angioneurotic edema"), or swelling due to leakage of fluid from blood vessels into connective tissue. Deficiency of C1-inhibitor permits plasma kallikrein activation, which leads to the production of the vasoactive peptide bradykinin. Also, C4 and C2 cleavage goes unchecked, resulting in auto-activation of the complement system. In its most common form, it presents as marked swelling of the face, mouth and/or airway that occurs spontaneously or to minimal triggers (such as mild trauma), but such swelling can occur in any part of the body. In 85% of the cases, the levels of C1-inhibitor are low, while in 15% the protein circulates in normal amounts but it is dysfunctional. In addition to the episodes of facial swelling and/or abdominal pain, it also predisposes to autoimmune diseases, most markedly lupus erythematosus, due to its consumptive effect on complement factors 3 and 4. Mutations in the gene that codes for C1-inhibitor, SERPING1, may also play a role in the development of age-related macular degeneration. At least 97 disease-causing mutations in this gene have been discovered.

== Medical use ==
C1 esterase
Clinical data
- Trade names: Cinryze, Ruconest, Berinert, others
- Other names: RVG-19303, CSL830
- AHFS/Drugs.com: Monograph; Monograph; Multum Consumer Information
- License data: US DailyMed: C1 esterase
- Routes of administration: Intravenous
- ATC code: B06AC01 (WHO) B06AC04 (WHO)

Legal status
- Legal status: CA: ℞-only; UK: POM (Prescription only); US: ℞-only; EU: Rx-only; In general: ℞ (Prescription only)

Identifiers
- CAS Number: 1018837-94-9; 80295-38-1
- DrugBank: DB06404; DB09228
- UNII: 6KIC4BB60G; 5QS67N4551
- KEGG: D08780; D10845

=== Hereditary angioedema ===
Blood-derived C1-inhibitor is effective but does carry the risk associated with the use of any human blood product. Cinryze, a pharmaceutical-grade C1-inhibitor, was approved for the use of HAE in 2008 in the US after having been available in Europe for decades. It is a highly purified, pasteurized and nanofiltered plasma-derived C1 esterase inhibitor product; it has been approved for routine prophylaxis against angioedema attacks in adolescent and adult patients with HAE.

A recombinant C1-inhibitor obtained from the milk of transgenic rabbits, conestat alfa (brand name Ruconest), is approved for the treatment of acute HAE attacks in adults.

Other products also have been introduced including plasma-derived products such as Berinert and Haegarda.

=== Synthesis ===
C1-inhibitor is contained in the human blood; it can, therefore, be isolated from donated blood. Risks of infectious disease transmission (viruses, prions, etc.) and relative expense of isolation prevented widespread use. It is also possible to produce it by recombinant technology, but Escherichia coli (the most commonly used organism for this purpose) lacks the eukaryotic ability to glycosylate proteins; as C1-inhibitor is particularly heavily glycosylated, this sialylated recombinant form would have a short circulatory life (the carbohydrates are not relevant to the inhibitor function). Therefore, C1-inhibitor has also been produced in glycosylated form using transgenic rabbits. This form of recombinant C1-inhibitor also has been given orphan drug status for delayed graft function following organ transplantation and for capillary leakage syndrome.

== Research ==
The activation of the complement cascade can cause damage to cells, therefore the inhibition of the complement cascade can work as a medicine in certain conditions.
