= Plasma kallikrein =

Enzyme found in humans

KLKB1
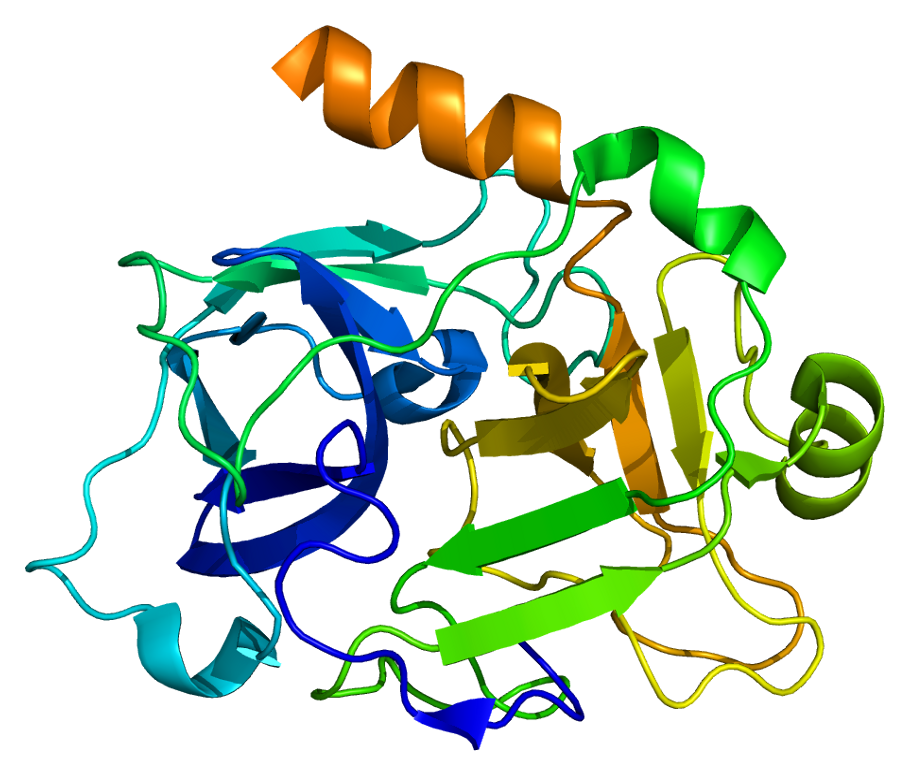

Identifiers
- Aliases: KLKB1, KLK3, PPK, PKKD, PKK, kallikrein B1
- External IDs: OMIM: 229000; MGI: 102849; GeneCards: KLKB1
Available structures
| PDB | Ortholog search: PDBe RCSB |
| PDB | List of PDB id codes 4OGY, 2ANW, 4OGX, 4ZJ4, 2ANY, 4ZJ5, 4ZJ6 |
Enzyme activity
| EC # | BRENDA | ExPASy | KEGG | MetaCyc |
|---|---|---|---|---|
| 3.4.21.34 | ↗ | ↗ | ↗ | ↗ |

Gene location (Human)
| Chr. | Chromosome 4 (human) |
| Band | 4q35.2 | Start | 186,208,979 bp |
| Band | 4q35.2 | End | 186,258,471 bp |

Gene location (Mouse)
| Chr. | Chromosome 8 (mouse) |
| Band | 8 B1.1|8 25.17 cM | Start | 45,719,726 bp |
| Band | 8 B1.1|8 25.17 cM | End | 45,747,896 bp |
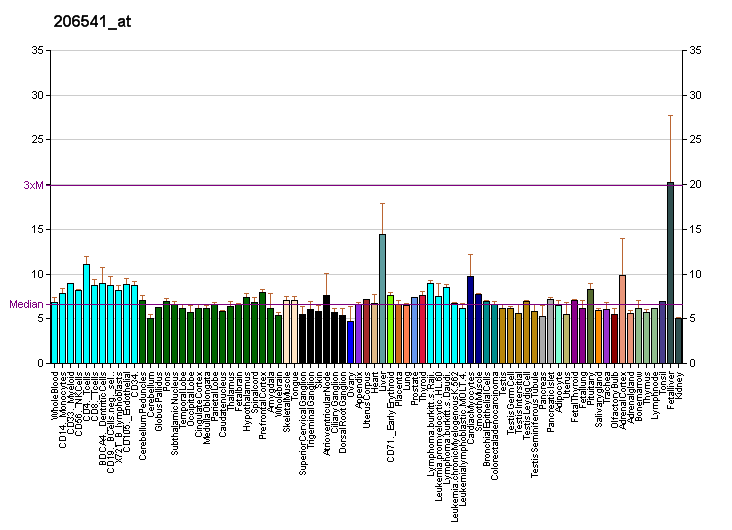
RNA expression pattern
| Bgee | Human / Mouse (ortholog); Top expressed in: right lobe of liver; gonad; tendon of biceps brachii; body of pancreas; testicle; pancreatic epithelial cell; jejunal mucosa; dorsal motor nucleus of vagus nerve; middle temporal gyrus; Epithelium of choroid plexus / Top expressed in: left lobe of liver; right lobe of liver; spermatid; sexually immature organism; neural layer of retina; epithelium of lens; right kidney; respiratory epithelium; nose; nasal epithelium; More reference expression data |
| BioGPS | More reference expression data |
Gene ontology
| Molecular function | serine-type peptidase activity; serine-type endopeptidase activity; peptidase activity; protein binding; hydrolase activity |
| Cellular component | extracellular exosome; plasma membrane; extracellular region; extracellular space |
| Biological process | positive regulation of fibrinolysis; zymogen activation; Factor XII activation; proteolysis; fibrinolysis; plasminogen activation; extracellular matrix disassembly; inflammatory response; hemostasis; blood coagulation; blood coagulation, intrinsic pathway |
Sources:Amigo / QuickGO
Orthologs
| Databases | NCBI: entry; OMA: entry |
| Species | Human | Mouse |
| Entrez | 3818 | 16621 |
| Ensembl | ENSG00000164344 | ENSMUSG00000109764 |
| UniProt | P03952 | P26262 |
| RefSeq (mRNA) | NM_000892; NM_001318394; NM_001318396 | NM_008455 |
| RefSeq (protein) | NP_000883; NP_001305323; NP_001305325 | NP_032481 |
| Location (UCSC) | Chr 4: 186.21 – 186.26 Mb | Chr 8: 45.72 – 45.75 Mb |
| PubMed search |
- Wikidata
| View/Edit Human | View/Edit Mouse |

Plasma kallikrein

Identifiers
- EC no.: 3.4.21.34
- CAS no.: 410538-33-9
- Alt. names: serum kallikrein, kininogenin, kallikrein I, kallikrein II, kininogenase, kallikrein, callicrein, glumorin, padreatin, padutin, kallidinogenase, bradykininogenase, panceatic kallikrein, onokrein P, dilminal D, depot-Padutin, urokallikrein, urinary kallikrein

Databases
- BRENDA: enzyme data
- ExPASy: NiceZyme view
- KEGG: enzyme entry
- MetaCyc: metabolic pathway
- Rhea: reactions
- PDB structures: RCSB PDB PDBe PDBsum
Search
- PMC: articles
- PubMed: articles
- NCBI: proteins

Plasma kallikrein (EC 3.4.21.34) is an enzyme that catalyses the following chemical reaction:

Selective cleavage of some Arg- and Lys- bonds, including Lys-Arg and Arg-Ser in (human) kininogen to release bradykinin

Plasma kallikrein and its precursor are encoded by the KLKB1 gene.

This enzyme is formed from prekallikrein (Fletcher factor) by factor XIIa.

== Function ==
Plasma prekallikrein is a glycoprotein that participates in the surface-dependent activation of blood coagulation, fibrinolysis, kinin generation and inflammation. It is synthesized in the liver and secreted into the blood as a single polypeptide chain. Plasma prekallikrein is converted to plasma kallikrein by factor XIIa by the cleavage of an internal Arg-Ile bond. Plasma kallikrein therefore is composed of a heavy chain and a light chain held together by a disulfide bond. The heavy chain originates from the amino-terminal end of the zymogen and contains 4 tandem repeats of 90 or 91 amino acids. Each repeat harbors a novel structure called the apple domain. The heavy chain is required for the surface-dependent pro-coagulant activity of plasma kallikrein. The light chain contains the active site or catalytic domain of the enzyme and is homologous to the trypsin family of serine proteases. Plasma prekallikrein deficiency causes a prolonged activated partial thromboplastin time in patients.

== Interactions ==
Kallikrein and prekallikrein have been shown to interact with High-molecular-weight kininogen.

== See also ==
- PA clan of proteases
