= Kininogen =

Class of proteins

Kininogens are precursor proteins for kinins, biologically active polypeptides involved in blood coagulation, vasodilation, smooth muscle contraction, inflammatory regulation, and the regulation of the cardiovascular and renal systems.

== Types of kininogen ==
There are two main types of kininogen (KNG), high-molecular-weight-kininogen and low-molecular-weight-kininogen, with a third type – T-kininogen – only found in rats but not humans.

=== High molecular weight kininogen ===
High-molecular-weight-kininogen (HK) is a non-enzymatic cofactor involved in the kinin-kallikrein system, which plays a role in blood coagulation, blood pressure regulation, and inflammation. It is synthesized in endothelial cells and is produced mostly by the liver. It is also a precursor protein for bradykinin.

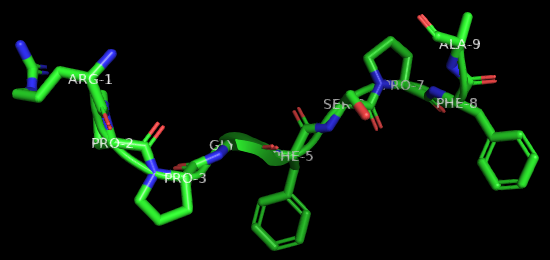
Protein structure of bradykinin. Bradykinin is a nine amino acid-long polypeptide made by the cleavage of high-molecular-weight kininogen at D4. It acts as an inflammatory mediator.

=== Low molecular weight kininogen ===
Low-molecular-weight-kininogen (LK) is mainly a precursor protein for kallidin. LK, however, is not actively involved in blood coagulation, but its byproducts can be later converted and introduced to the coagulation pathway.

=== T-kininogen ===
T-kininogen (TK) is only found in rats and is a protein whose function is still being researched. TK is believed to be a biological indicator of senescence in rats, which can be measured by the level of endothelial cell production during the aging process.

== Structure ==
HK consists of 644 amino acid residues, which are separated into six different domains. Domains 1, 2, and 3 are called the "heavy chain" with Domains 2 and 3 having cysteine protease activity. Domains 5 and 6 are called the "light chain," both of which bind specific molecules: Domain 5 binds heparin and zinc and selectively binds to anionic surfaces while Domain 6 binds prekallikrein, the protease precursor to plasma kallikrein. Domain 4 connects the heavy chain and light chain together, and its cleavage at this site releases bradykinin.

LK consists of 427 amino acid residues, which can also be separated into a "heavy chain" and a "light chain."

T-kininogen consists of 430 amino acid residues.

HK and LK are created by the alternative splicing of the same kininogen (KNG) gene, which in humans, is located at chromosome 3q27. Kininogens are related to cystatins through their similar glycosylated regions.

== Function ==
=== High-molecular weight kininogen ===
During the contact activation system (CAS), also known as the intrinsic pathway, the binding of HK, factor XII (FXII), and prekallikrein (PK) to an anionic surface initiates blood coagulation and the kinin-kallikrein system through the activation of a cascade of enzymes. Factor XII is a zymogen, and upon binding with tissue to the anionic surface, exhibits some protease activity, starting the enzymatic cascade. Both the intrinsic and its corresponding extrinsic pathway, which is activated when outside trauma activates tissue factor (TF), an important glycoprotein, culminate in the activation of a serine protease called Factor X. Factor X is responsible for the conversion of prothrombin into an important protease in clotting called thrombin, which itself participates in the clotting cascade by activating more enzymes and proteins downstream in order to create even more thrombin.

In the kinin-kallikrein system, the proteolytic cleavage of HK by the enzyme plasma kallikrein makes bradykinin, an inflammatory mediator that can lower blood pressure by way of vasodilation. The kinin-kallikrein system plays a small role in coagulation.

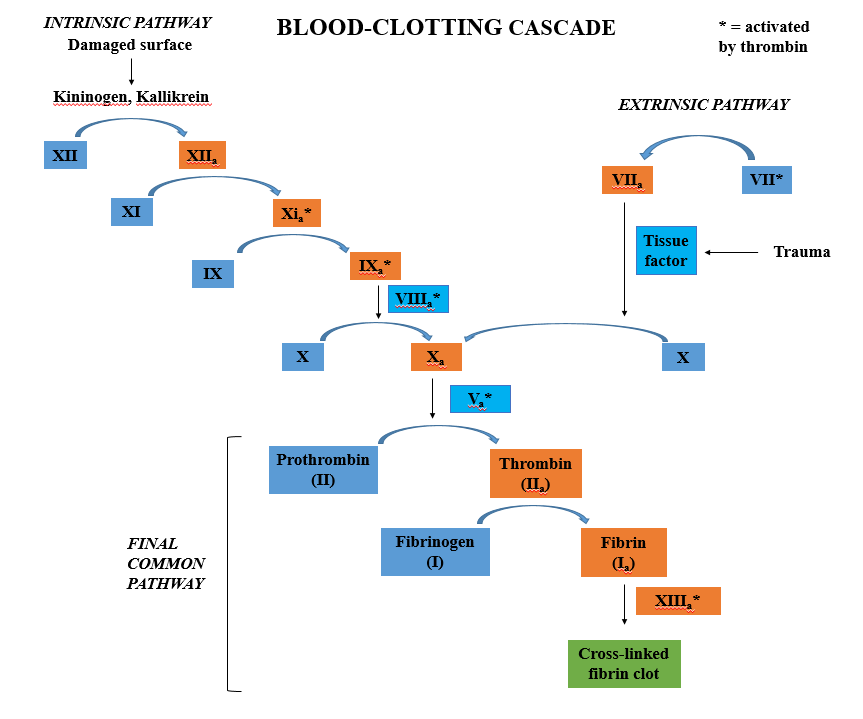
Blood clotting cascade. The blood clotting cascade consists of the intrinsic and extrinsic pathway, both of which create thrombin, a protease involved in blood clotting. The intrinsic pathway requires kininogen, specifically high molecular weight kininogen, as a cofactor.

HK and LK are noncompetitive inhibitors of activated thrombin.

=== Low-molecular weight kininogen ===
The proteolytical cleavage of LK by tissue kallikreins creates kallidin, which is a possible substrate for carboxypeptidase M. Kallidin can be converted into bradykinin by Aminopeptidase B, creating a connection between LK and the kinin-kallikrein system.

=== T-kininogen ===
Research has shown that T-kininogen is a possible biomarker for senescence within rats.

== Disease and medical relevance ==
Increased levels of kininogen in the plasma and tissues are associated with injury, inflammation, myocardial infarction, and diabetes. Additionally, kininogen's role in the contact activation system means that increased levels of kininogen can also contribute to the development of hereditary angioedema, a disorder characterized by periodic episodes of swelling.

KNG is believed to play a role in the formation of thrombi, or blood clots that obstruct a vessel, and in inflammation. The inhibition of KNG is potentially a selective strategy to fight stroke, deep vein thrombosis (DVT), and other venous thromboembolic diseases. Kininogen-1 has also been found to be an effective biomarker in detecting certain types of cancer, namely colorectal cancer.

Bradykinin, the cleavage product of high molecular weight kininogen, is influenced by a class of drugs called angiotensin converting enzyme inhibitors (ACE inhibitors) that aim to increase bradykinin levels by impeding its degradation.
