= Kazal domain =

Kazal-type serine protease inhibitor domain
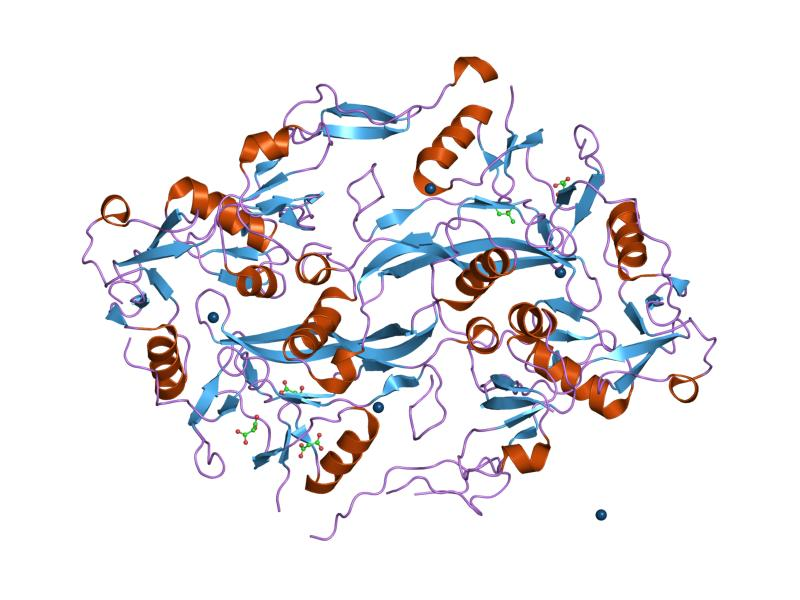
- the structure of the follistatin:activin complex

Identifiers
- Symbol: Kazal_1
- Pfam: PF00050
- InterPro: IPR002350
- PROSITE: PDOC00254
- SCOP2: 3sgb / SCOPe / SUPFAM
Available protein structures:
- PDB: IPR002350 PF00050 (ECOD; PDBsum)
- AlphaFold: IPR002350; PF00050

Kazal-type serine protease inhibitor domain
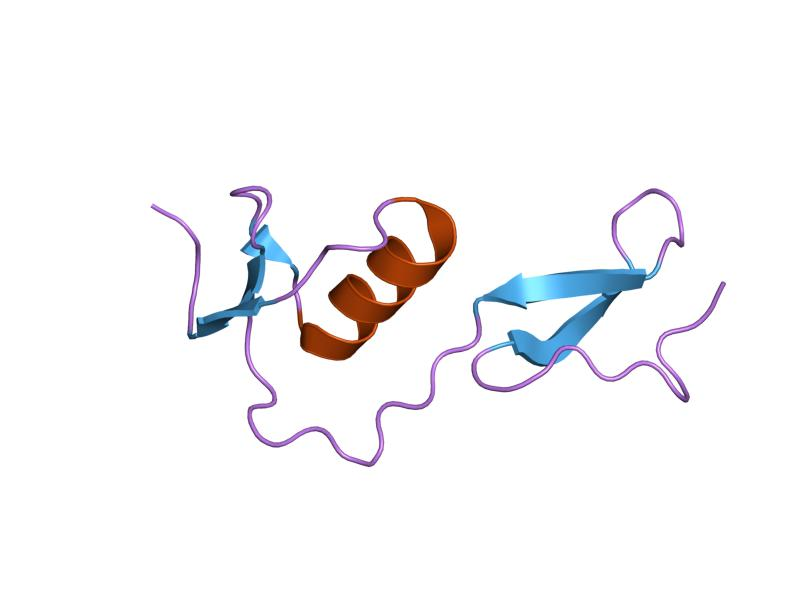
- structure of fs1, the heparin-binding domain of follistatin

Identifiers
- Symbol: Kazal_2
- Pfam: PF07648
- InterPro: IPR011497
- PROSITE: PDOC00254
- SCOP2: 3sgb / SCOPe / SUPFAM
Available protein structures:
- PDB: IPR011497 PF07648 (ECOD; PDBsum)
- AlphaFold: IPR011497; PF07648

The Kazal domain is an evolutionary conserved protein domain usually indicative of serine protease inhibitors. However, kazal-like domains are also seen in the extracellular part of agrins, which are not known to be protease inhibitors.

In animals, serine protease inhibitors that act via their Kazal domain are grouped under the MEROPS inhibitor family I1, clan IA.

== Kazal 1 ==
Kazal domains often occur in tandem arrays. Small alpha+beta fold containing three disulfide bonds. Alignment also includes a single domain from transporters in the OATP/PGT family P46721.

Peptide proteinase inhibitors can be found as single domain proteins or as single or multiple domains within proteins; these are referred to as either simple or compound inhibitors, respectively. In many cases they are synthesised as part of a larger precursor protein, either as a prepropeptide or as an N-terminal domain associated with an inactive peptidase or zymogen. This domain prevents access of the substrate to the active site. Removal of the N-terminal inhibitor domain either by interaction with a second peptidase or by autocatalytic cleavage activates the zymogen. Other inhibitors interact direct with proteinases using a simple noncovalent lock and key mechanism; while yet others use a conformational change-based trapping mechanism that depends on their structural and thermodynamic properties.

This family of Kazal inhibitors, belongs to MEROPS inhibitor family I1, clan IA. They inhibit serine peptidases of the S1 family (INTERPRO). The members are primarily metazoan, but includes exceptions in the alveolata (apicomplexa), stramenopiles, higher plants and bacteria.

Kazal inhibitors, which inhibit a number of serine proteases (such as trypsin and elastase), belong to family of proteins that includes pancreatic secretory trypsin inhibitor; avian ovomucoid; acrosin inhibitor; and elastase inhibitor. These proteins contain between 1 and 7 Kazal-type inhibitor repeats.

The structure of the Kazal repeat includes a large quantity of extended chain, 2 short alpha-helices and a 3-stranded anti-parallel beta sheet. The inhibitor makes 11 contacts with its enzyme substrate: unusually, 8 of these important residues are hypervariable. Altering the enzyme-contact residues, and especially that of the active site bond, affects the strength of inhibition and specificity of the inhibitor for particular serine proteases. The presence of this Pfam domain is usually indicative of serine protease inhibitors, however, Kazal-like domains are also seen in the extracellular part of agrins which are not known to be proteinase inhibitors.

Human proteins with Kazal 1 domains:

- AGRIN, CPAMD8
- FST, FSTL3, FSTL4, FSTL5
- IGFBPL1
- SMOC1, SPARC, SPARCL1, SPINK1, SPINK2, SPINK4, SPINK5, SPINK5L2, SPINK5L3, SPINK6, SPINK7, SPINK9
- TMEFF1, TMEFF2

== Kazal 2 ==
This domain is usually indicative of serine protease inhibitors that belong to Merops inhibitor families: I1, I2, I17 and I31. However, kazal-like domains are also seen in the extracellular part of agrins, which are not known to be protease inhibitors. Kazal domains often occur in tandem arrays and have a central alpha-helix, a short two-stranded antiparallel beta-sheet and several disulphide bonds. The amino terminal segment of this domain binds to the active site of its target proteases, thus inhibiting their function.

Human proteins with Kazal 2 domains:

- C6, CFI
- FSTL1, FSTL3
- HTRA1, HTRA3, HTRA4
- IGFBP7, KAZALD1, LST3, RECK
- SLC21A8, SLCO1A2, SLCO1B1, SLCO1B3, SLCO1C1, SLCO2A1, SLCO3A1, SLCO4A1, SLCO4C1, SLCO5A1, SLCO6A1, SMOC2, SPINK5, SPOCK1, SPOCK2, SPOCK3
- WFIKKN1, WFIKKN2
