= Hyperimmunoglobulin E syndrome =

Hyper-IgE syndrome
- Other names: HIES
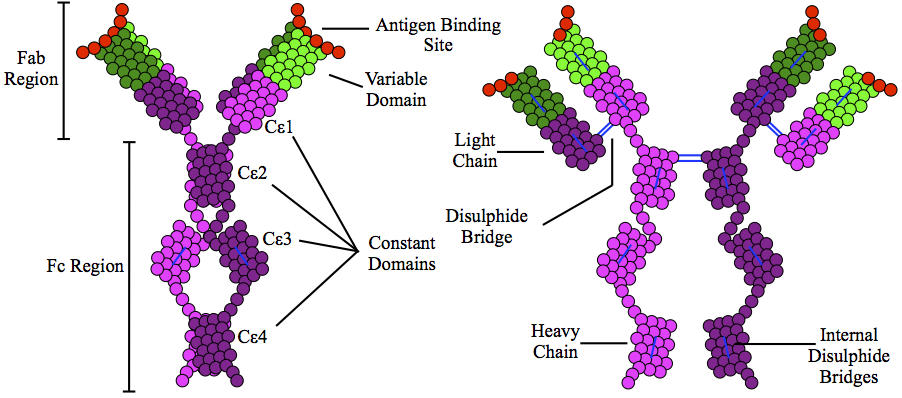
- The structure of the Immunoglobulin E (IgE) antibody.
- Specialty: Immunology

Hyperimmunoglobulinemia E syndrome (HIES), of which the autosomal dominant form is called Job's syndrome or Buckley syndrome, is a heterogeneous group of immune disorders. Job's is also very rare at about 300 cases currently in literature.

== Presentation ==
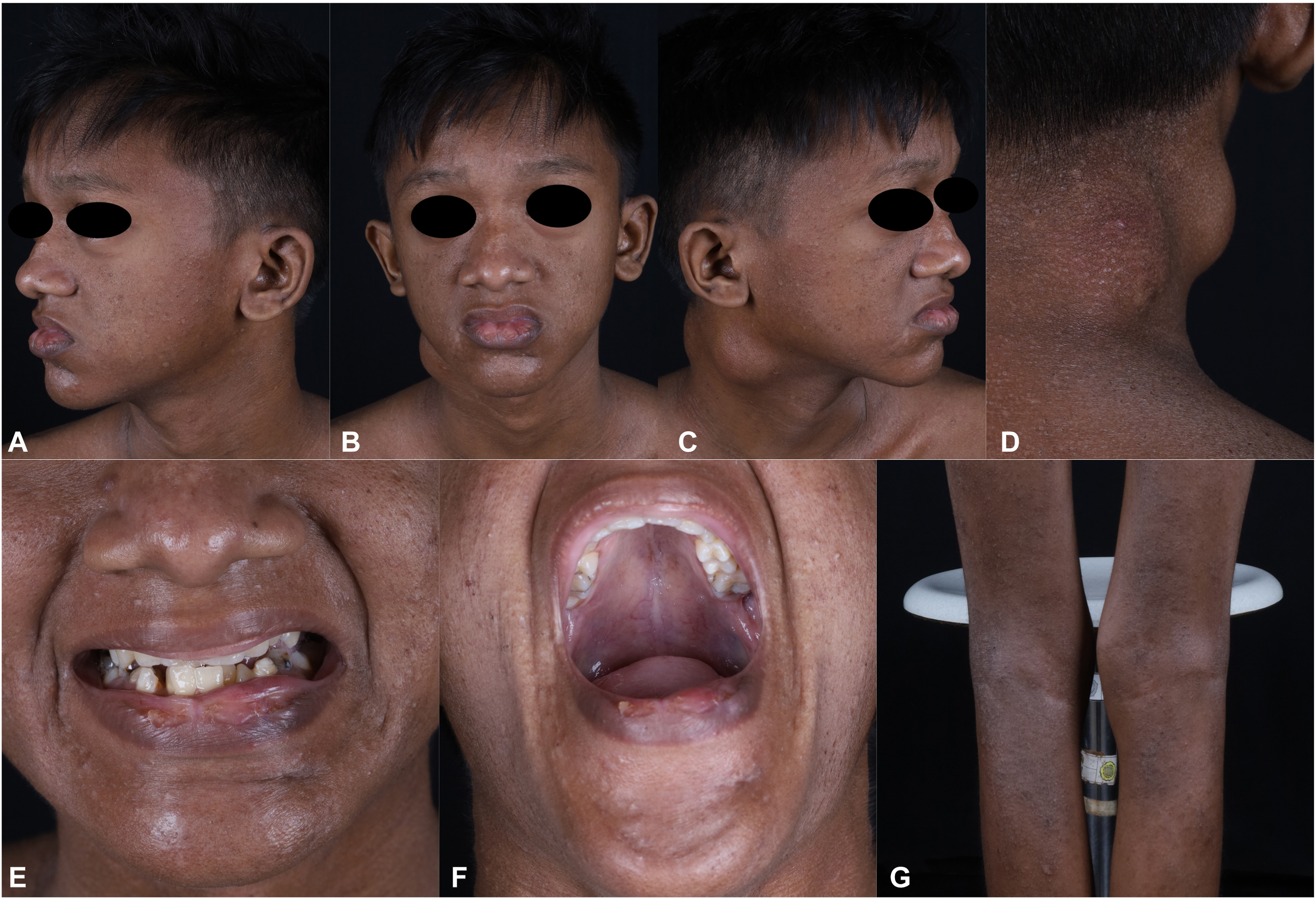
This illustration shows person with Job's syndrome, with dysmorphic facial features (such as:deep-set eyes, increased intercanthal distance, prognathism, broad nasal bridge, and a high-arched palate), prognathism, eczematous lesions and xerotic skin, cold abscess on the neck, and high-arched palate.

It is characterized by recurrent "cold" staphylococcal infections (due to impaired recruitment of neutrophils), unusual eczema-like skin rashes, severe lung infections that result in pneumatoceles (balloon-like lesions that may be filled with air or pus or scar tissue) and very high (> 2000 IU/mL or 4800 mcg/L) concentrations of the serum antibody IgE. Inheritance can be autosomal dominant or autosomal recessive. Many patients with autosomal dominant STAT3 hyper-IgE syndrome have characteristic facial and dental abnormalities, fail to lose their primary teeth, and have two sets of teeth simultaneously.

== Pathophysiology ==
Abnormal neutrophil chemotaxis due to decreased production of interferon gamma by T lymphocytes is thought to cause the disease.

Both autosomal dominant and recessive inheritance have been described:

Autosomal dominant:

- STAT3 may present as HIES with characteristic facial, dental, and skeletal abnormalities that has been called Job's Syndrome. A common mnemonic used to remember the symptoms is FATED: coarse or leonine facies, cold staph abscesses, retained primary teeth, increased IgE, and dermatologic problems [eczema]. The disease was linked to mutations in the STAT3 gene after cytokine profiles indicated alterations in the STAT3 pathway. This altered pathway directly reduces the modulation capacity of interleukins 6 and 10 which, respectively, inhibit the genesis of Th17 cells that, in tandem with CD4 cells, protect against bacterial and fungal infections, and foster the inappropriate immune responses exhibited by those with Job Syndrome.

Autosomal recessive:

- DOCK8 - DOCK8 Immunodeficiency Syndrome (DIDS) presents primarily with immune effects including HEIS. Eczema is prominent, food and environmental allergies are common, and asthma and anaphylaxis has been variably reported.
- PGM3, a Congenital Disorder of Glycosylation, may present as HIES with neurocognitive impairment and hypomyelination. See PGM3 deficiency.
- SPINK5 may present as HIES with skin and hair effects such as trichorrhexis invaginata (bamboo hair). See Netherton Syndrome (NTS).
- TYK2 may present as HIES, although more often only with immunodeficiency.

== Diagnosis ==
Elevated IgE is the hallmark of HIES. An IgE level greater than 2,000 IU/mL is often considered diagnostic. However, patients younger than 6 months of age may have very low to non-detectable IgE levels. Eosinophilia is also a common finding with greater than 90% of patients having eosinophil elevations greater than two standard deviations above the normal mean. Genetic testing is available for STAT3 (Job's Syndrome), DOCK8 (DOCK8 Immunodeficiency or DIDS), PGM3 (PGM3 deficiency), SPINK5 (Netherton Syndrome - NTS), and TYK2 genetic defects.

=== Types ===
HIES often appears early in life with recurrent staphylococcal and candidal infections, pneumonias, and eczematoid skin.

- Autosomal dominant Hyper-IgE Syndrome caused by STAT3 defects, called Job Syndrome, have characteristic facial, dental, and skeletal abnormalities. Patients with STAT3 HIES may have either delay of or failure in shedding of primary teeth. The characteristic facial features are usually set by age 16. These include facial asymmetry, a prominent forehead, deep-set eyes, a broad nasal bridge, a wide, fleshy nasal tip, and mild prognathism. Additionally, facial skin is rough with prominent pores. Finally, some patients with STAT3 HIES have scoliosis, as well as bones that fracture easily.
- Autosomal recessive

== Treatment ==
Most patients with hyper IgE syndrome are treated with long-term antibiotic therapy to prevent staphylococcal infections. Good skin care is also important in patients with hyper IgE syndrome. High-dose intravenous gamma-globulin has also been suggested for the treatment of severe eczema in patients with HIES and atopic dermatitis.

== History ==
HIES was first described by Davis et al. in 1966 in two girls with red hair, chronic dermatitis, and recurrent staphylococcal abscesses and pneumonias. They named the disease after the biblical figure Job, whose body was covered with boils by Satan. In 1972, Buckley et al. described two boys with similar symptoms as well as coarse facies, eosinophilia, and elevated serum IgE levels. These two syndromes are thought to be the same and are under the broad category of HIES.

== See also ==
- Isolated primary immunoglobulin M deficiency
- List of cutaneous conditions
- List of dental abnormalities associated with cutaneous conditions
