= Organic anion transporter family =

Family of transport proteins

Organic-anion-transporting polypeptide (OATP) family

Identifiers
- Symbol: OATP
- Pfam: PF03137
- InterPro: IPR004156
- TCDB: 2.A.60
Available protein structures:
- PDB: IPR004156 PF03137 (ECOD; PDBsum)
- AlphaFold: IPR004156; PF03137

Members of the Organic Anion Transporter (OAT) Family (organic-anion-transporting polypeptides, OATP) are membrane transport proteins or 'transporters' that mediate the transport of mainly organic anions across the cell membrane. Therefore, OATPs are present in the lipid bilayer of the cell membrane, acting as the cell's gatekeepers. OATPs belong to the Solute Carrier Family (SLC) and the major facilitator superfamily.

The generalized transport reactions catalyzed by members of the OAT family are:

Anion (in) → Anion (out)

Anion_{1} (in) + Anion_{2} (out) → Anion_{1} (out) + Anion_{2} (in)

== Function ==
Proteins of the OAT family catalyze the Na^{+}-independent facilitated transport of fairly large amphipathic organic anions (and less frequently neutral or cationic drugs), such as bromosulfobromophthalein, prostaglandins, conjugated and unconjugated bile acids (taurocholate and cholate), steroid conjugates, thyroid hormones, anionic oligopeptides, drugs, toxins and other xenobiotics. One family member, OATP2B1, has been shown to use cytoplasmic glutamate as the exchanging anion. Among the well characterized substrates are numerous drugs including statins, angiotensin-converting enzyme inhibitors, angiotensin receptor blockers, antibiotics, antihistaminics, antihypertensives and anticancer drugs. Other substrates include luciferin, thyroid hormones and quinolones.

Organic anion transporting polypeptides carry bile acids as well as bilirubin and numerous hormones such as thyroid and steroid hormones across the basolateral membrane (facing sinusoids) in hepatocytes, for excretion in bile. As well as expression in the liver, OATPs are expressed in many other tissues on basolateral and apical membranes, transporting anions, as well as neutral and even cationic compounds. They also transport an extremely diverse range of drug compounds, ranging from anti-cancer, antibiotic, lipid lowering to anti-diabetic drugs, as well as toxins and poisons.

Various anti-cancer drugs like pazopanib, vandetanib, nilotinib, canertinib and erlotinib are known to be transported via OATPs (OATP-1B1 and OATP-1B3). Some of these have also been reported as inhibitors of certain OATPs: pazopanib and nilotinib against OATP-1B1 and vandetanib against OATP-1B3.

They also transport the dye bromsulfthalein, availing it as a liver-testing substance.

== Homology ==
The various paralogues in a mammal have differing but overlapping substrate specificities and tissue distributions as summarized by Hagenbuch and Meier. These authors also provide a phylogenetic tree of the mammalian members of the family, showing that they fall into five recognizable subfamilies, four of which exhibit deep branching sub-subfamilies. However, all sequences within a subfamily are >60% identical while those between subfamilies are >40% identical. As also shown by Hagenbuch and Meier, all but one (OatP4a1) of the mammalian homologues cluster together, separately from all other animal (insect and worm) homologues.

OAT family homologues have been found in other animals but not outside of the animal kingdom. These transporters have been characterized in mammals, but homologues are present in Drosophila melanogaster, Anopheles gambiae, and Caenorhabditis elegans. The mammalian OAT family proteins exhibit a high degree of tissue specificity.

== Human proteins ==
The table below shows the 11 known human OATPs. Note: Human OATPs are designated with capital letters, animal Oatps are designated with lower case letters. The 'SLCO' stands for their gene name; 'solute carrier organic anion.' Previous nomenclature using letters and numbers (e.g. OATP-A, OATP-8 is no longer used. The most well characterised human OATPs are OATP1A2, OATP1B1, OATP1B3 and OATP2B1. Very little is known about the function and characteristics of OATP5A1 and OATP6A1.

Abbreviation	Protein Name	Location
SLCO1A2	Solute carrier organic anion transporter family member 1A2	Ubiquitous
SLCO1B1	Solute carrier organic anion transporter family member 1B1	Liver
SLCO1B3	Solute carrier organic anion transporter family member 1B3	Liver
SLCO1C1	Solute carrier organic anion transporter family member 1C1	Brain, testis
SLCO2A1	Solute carrier organic anion transporter family member 2A1	Ubiquitous
SLCO2B1	Solute carrier organic anion transporter family member 2B1	Ubiquitous
SLCO3A1	Solute carrier organic anion transporter family member 3A1	Testis, brain, heart, lung, spleen
SLCO4A1	Solute carrier organic anion transporter family member 4A1	Heart, placenta, lung, liver
SLCO4C1	Solute carrier organic anion transporter family member 4C1	Kidney
SLCO5A1	Solute carrier organic anion transporter family member 5A1	Breast, fetal brain, prostate
SLCO6A1	Solute carrier organic anion transporter family member 6A1	Testes, spleen, brain, placenta

== Pharmacology ==
The OATPs play a role in the transport of some classes of drugs across the cell membrane, particularly in the liver and kidney. In the liver, OATPs are expressed on the basolateral membrane of hepatocytes, transporting compounds into the hepatocyte for biotransformation. A number of drug-drug interactions have been associated with the OATPs, affecting the pharmacokinetics and pharmacodynamics of drugs. This is most commonly where one drug inhibits the transport of another drug into the hepatocyte, so that it is retained longer in the body (i.e. increased plasma half-life). The OATPs most associated with these interactions are OATP1B1, OATP1B3 and OATP2B1, which are all present on the hepatocyte basolateral (sinusoidal) membrane. OATP1B1 and OATP1B3 are known to play an important role in hepatic drug disposition. These OATPs contribute towards first step of hepatic accumulation and can influence the disposition of drug via hepatic route. The most clinically relevant interactions have been associated with the lipid lowering drugs statins, which led to the removal of cerivastatin from the market in 2002. Single nucleotide polymorphisms (SNPs) are also associated with the OATPs; particularly OATP1B1.

Many modulators of OATP function have been identified based on in vitro research in OATP-transfected cell lines. Both OATP activation and inhibition has been observed and an in silico model for structure-based identification of OATP modulation was developed.

Since tyrosine kinase inhibitors (TKIs) are metabolized in the liver, interaction of TKIs with OATP1B1 and OATP1B3 can be considered as important molecular targets for transporter mediated drug-drug interactions.

Along with the organic cation transporters and the ATP-binding cassette transporters, the OATPs play an important role in the absorption, distribution, metabolism and excretion (ADME) of many drugs.

== Evolution ==
OATPs are present in many animals, including fruit flies, zebrafish, dogs, cows, rats, mice, monkeys and horses. OATPs are not present in bacteria, indicating their evolution from the animal kingdom. However homologs do not correlate well with the human OATPs and therefore it is likely that isoforms arose by gene duplication. OATPs have however been found in insects, suggesting that their evolution was early in the formation of the animal kingdom.
