= Follistatin-related protein =

Follistatin-related protein can refer to:

- FSTL1
- FSTL3
