= Mean platelet volume =

Component of blood test

- Purpose: can be used to make inferences about platelet production in bone marrow or platelet destruction problems

Mean platelet volume (MPV) is a machine-calculated measurement of the average size of platelets found in blood and is typically included in blood tests as part of the CBC. Since the average platelet size is larger when the body is producing increased numbers of platelets, the MPV test results can be used to make inferences about platelet production in bone marrow or platelet destruction problems.

An increased mean platelet volume (MPV) increases the risk to suffer a heart disease

MPV may be higher when there is destruction of platelets. This may be seen in immune thrombocytopenic purpura (ITP), myeloproliferative diseases and Bernard–Soulier syndrome. It may also be related to pre-eclampsia and recovery from transient hypoplasia.

Abnormally low MPV values may correlate with thrombocytopenia when it is due to impaired production of megakaryocytes in the bone marrow, such as in aplastic anemia. A low MPV may indicate inflammatory bowel disease (IBD), such as Crohn's disease and ulcerative colitis. A high MPV is also a bad prognostic marker in patients with sepsis or septic shock. In addition, low MPV may correlate with abnormally small platelet size, sometimes a symptom of a spectrum referred to as Wiskott–Aldrich syndrome (WAS), caused by a genetic mutation of the WAS gene.

Sample for MPV testing is obtained in a Lavender-Top EDTA tube. A typical range of platelet volumes is 7.2 - 11.7 fL (femtolitre), equivalent to spheres 2.65 to 2.9 μm in diameter.

== Conditions associated with altered MPV ==
=== Decreased MPV ===
- Cytotoxic chemotherapy
- Hypersplenism
- Reactive thrombocytosis
- Iron-deficiency anemia
- Gilbert's syndrome
- Acquired Immunodeficiency Syndrome (AIDS)
- Wiskott–Aldrich syndrome
- X linked thrombocytopenia
- Crohn's disease
- Ulcerative colitis
- Aplastic anemia
- Megaloblastic anemia

=== Increased MPV ===
- Immune thrombocytopenia
- Disseminated intravascular coagulation
- Myeloproliferative disorders
- Administration of erythropoietin / thrombopoietin
- Recovery from transient hypoplasia
- Gray platelet syndrome
- GATA-1 mutation
- vWD Type 2B
- Platelet Type vWD
- Paris-Trousseau syndrome
- Mediterranean macrothrombocytopenia
- Bernard–Soulier syndrome
- MYH9-related disorders
- 21q11 deletion syndrome
- Chronic myelogenous leukemia
- Post-splenectomy
- Vasculitis
- Diabetes mellitus
- Pre-eclampsia
- Chronic kidney disease
- Respiratory diseases
- Thrombocytopenia secondary to sepsis
- Hyperthyroidism
- Hypothyroidism
- Myocardial infarction
- Artificial heart valves
- Massive hemorrhage

== Inherited thrombocytopenia with normal MPV ==
- ATRUS Syndrome
- Thrombocytopenia 2 (THC2)
- Congenital amegakaryocytic thrombocytopenia
- TAR syndrome
- Familial platelet disorder with predisposition to AML
