= Sung-Yun Pai =

American physician-scientist and cell biologist

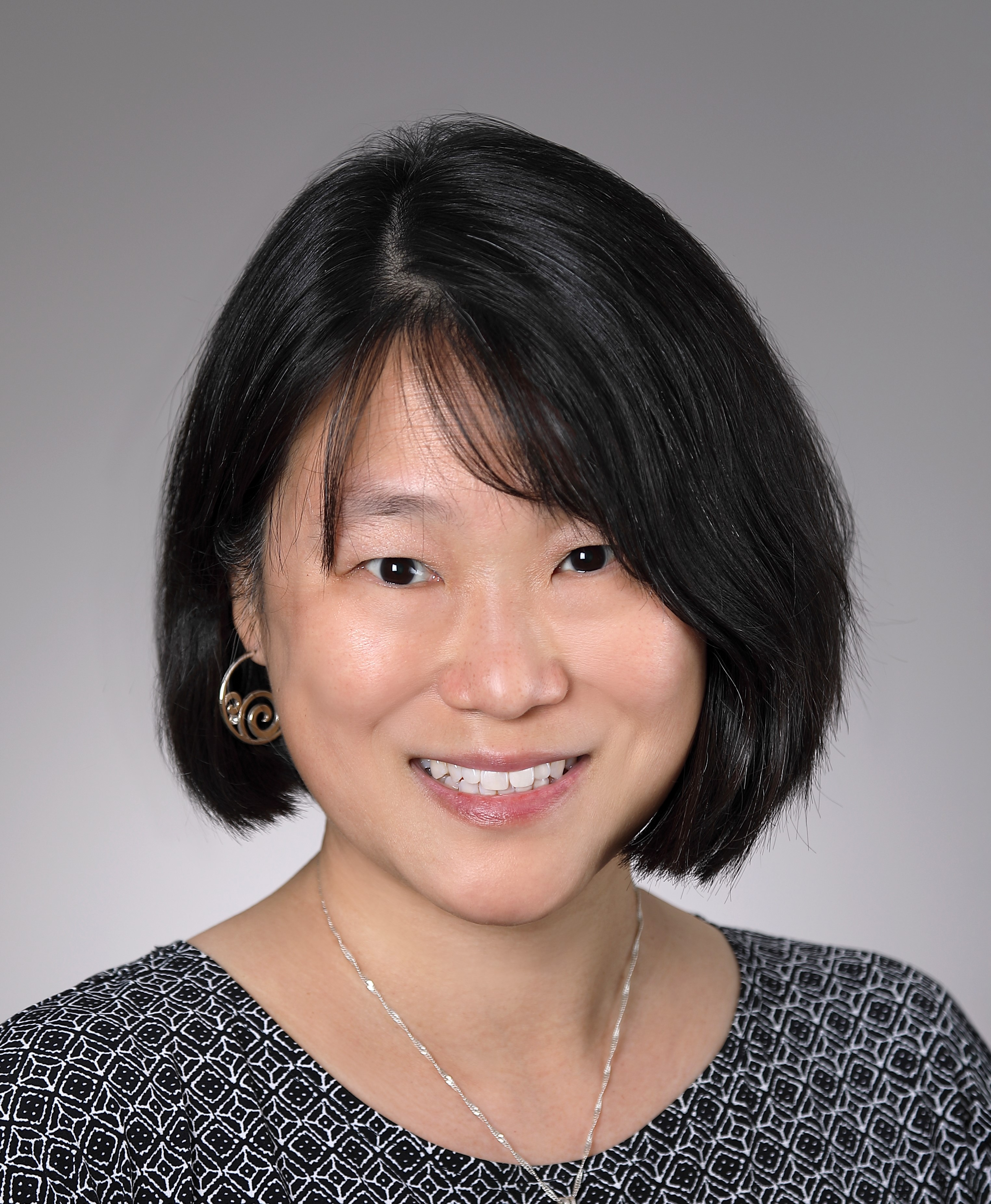
- Education: Harvard University
- Scientific career
- Fields: Pediatric hematology-oncology, cellular and gene therapies
- Workplaces: Harvard University; National Institutes of Health

Sung-Yun Pai is an American physician-scientist and pediatric hematologist-oncologist serving as chief of the Immune Deficiency Cellular Therapy Program at the National Cancer Institute since 2020. Her research focuses on cellular and gene therapies for inborn errors of immunity, including severe combined immunodeficiency, Wiskott–Aldrich syndrome, and DOCK8 deficiency.

== Early life and education ==
Pai was raised in the Northeastern United States. Her mother graduated from medical school in Seoul, Korea in 1964 as one of six women in her class. Pai attended Miss Porter's School. She earned an undergraduate degree in East Asian Languages and Civilizations. She received her M.D. from Harvard Medical School.

During medical school, Pai took a year off and worked in the laboratory of Barbara Bierer at Brigham and Women's Hospital, where she conducted calcineurin phosphatase assays and investigated the effects of cyclosporine A in transplant patients. This experience introduced her to the field of transplant and immunology. At Harvard, her research focused on the cellular biology of calcineurin and the mechanisms of action of cyclosporine, tacrolimus, and sirolimus.

Pai completed a residency in pediatrics at Boston Children's Hospital and a fellowship in pediatric hematology-oncology at Boston Children's Hospital and the Dana–Farber Cancer Institute. She performed postdoctoral research in the laboratories of Jeffrey Leiden, I-Cheng Ho, and Laurie Glimcher on the roles of the transcription factor GATA3 in thymocyte development, T helper 2 cell function, CD8 T cells, invariant NK-T cells, and in breast cancer and keratinocyte biology.

== Career ==
As a faculty member at Harvard Medical School, Pai specialized in hematopoietic stem cell transplantation for pediatric patients with inborn errors of immunity. She also led a research program on the development and implementation of clinical trials in transplantation and gene therapy for these conditions. She was appointed associate professor in 2016 and served as associate director and then co-director of the gene therapy program at Boston Children's Hospital

In 2020, Pai joined the National Cancer Institute (NCI) and the National Institute of Allergy and Infectious Diseases as chief of the Immune Deficiency Cellular Therapy Program. She is also a senior investigator at the Center for Cancer Research at the NCI. Her work focuses on cellular and gene therapies for inborn errors of immunity, including severe combined immunodeficiency (SCID), Wiskott–Aldrich syndrome (WAS), and DOCK8 deficiency.

As of 2025, Pai leads two multi-institutional trials in SCID. One is the Conditioning SCID Infants Diagnosed Early (CSIDE) trial, which compares low- and moderate-dose busulfan conditioning before allogeneic hematopoietic stem cell transplantation in SCID patients with IL2RG, JAK3, RAG1, or RAG2 mutations. Her group also analyzes outcomes of a gene therapy trial for X-linked SCID.

In the context of WAS and DOCK8 deficiency, her laboratory studies cytoskeletal regulation in immune cells and is developing gene therapy strategies based on their shared expression patterns to achieve regulated expression in immune cells.

== Personal life ==
Pai has children with her husband who is a retired colonel in the U.S. Army.
