= Alpha-D-phosphohexomutase superfamily =

Superfamily of enzymes

Alpha-D-phosphohexomutase
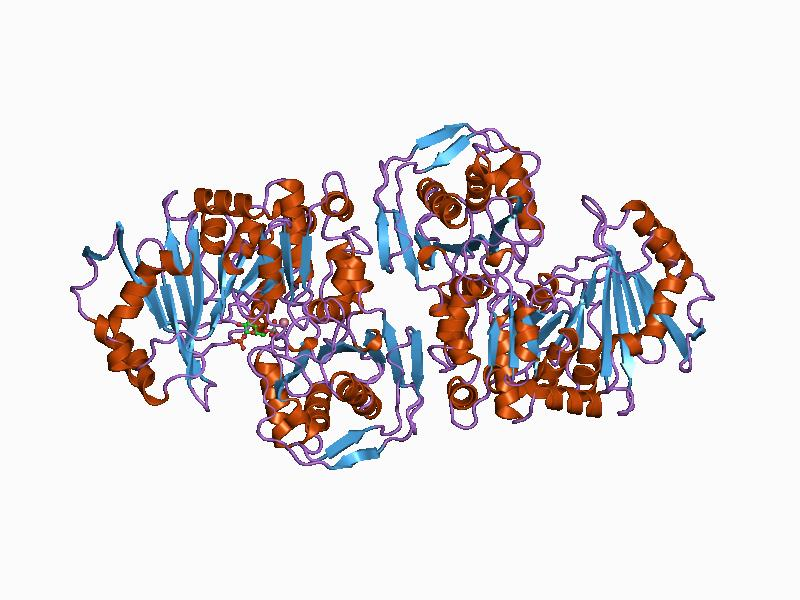
- Cartoon representation of the structure of the crystal structure of Phosphoglucomutase-1 from rabbit (PDB: 1c4g)

Identifiers
- Symbol: PGM_I-III
- Pfam clan: CL0754
- ECOD: 7528.1.1
- InterPro: IPR016055
- CDD: cd03084

The alpha-D-phosphohexomutases are a large superfamily of enzymes, with members in all three domains of life. Enzymes from this superfamily are ubiquitous in organisms from E. coli to humans, and catalyze a phosphoryl transfer reaction on a phosphosugar substrate. Four well studied subgroups in the superfamily are:

1. Phosphoglucomutase (PGM)
2. Phosphoglucomutase/Phosphomannomutase (PGM/PMM)
3. Phosphoglucosamine mutase (PNGM)
4. Phosphoaceytlglucosamine mutase (PAGM)

Other enzymes in the superfamily are known to act as glucose 1,6-bisphosphate synthases and phosphopentomutases.

== Background ==
A number of proteins in the superfamily have been characterized functionally and structurally. This table illustrates different members of the superfamily.

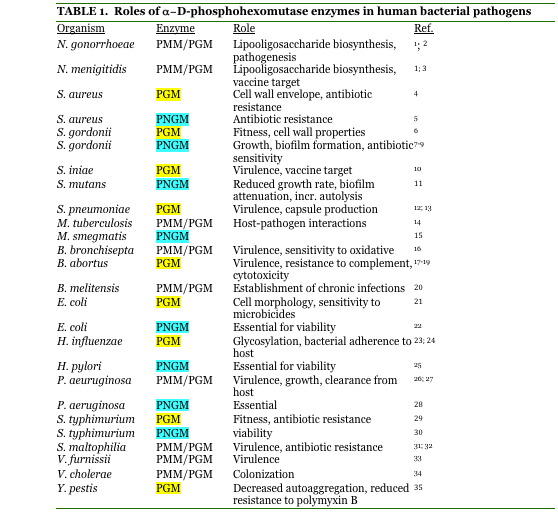
Summary of the superfamily

== Catalytic reaction ==
The enzymes in the superfamily typically catalyze the reversible conversion of 1-phosphosugars to 6-phosphosugars. The reaction proceeds via a bisphosphorylated sugar intermediate. The active form of the enzyme is phosphorylated at a conserved serine residue in the active site, and also requires a bound metal ion, typically Mg^{2+} for full activity. The initial phosphoryl transfer takes place from the phosphoserine to the substrate, creating a bisphosphorylated sugar intermediate. This is followed by a second phosphoryl transfer from the substrate back to enzyme, producing product and regenerating the active form of the enzyme.

== Structure and oligomeric state ==
Structures of multiple enzymes have been determined through X-ray crystallography. In general, they share a very similar topology. With a heart-shape and four domains (see image below), most enzymes appear to be monomers.

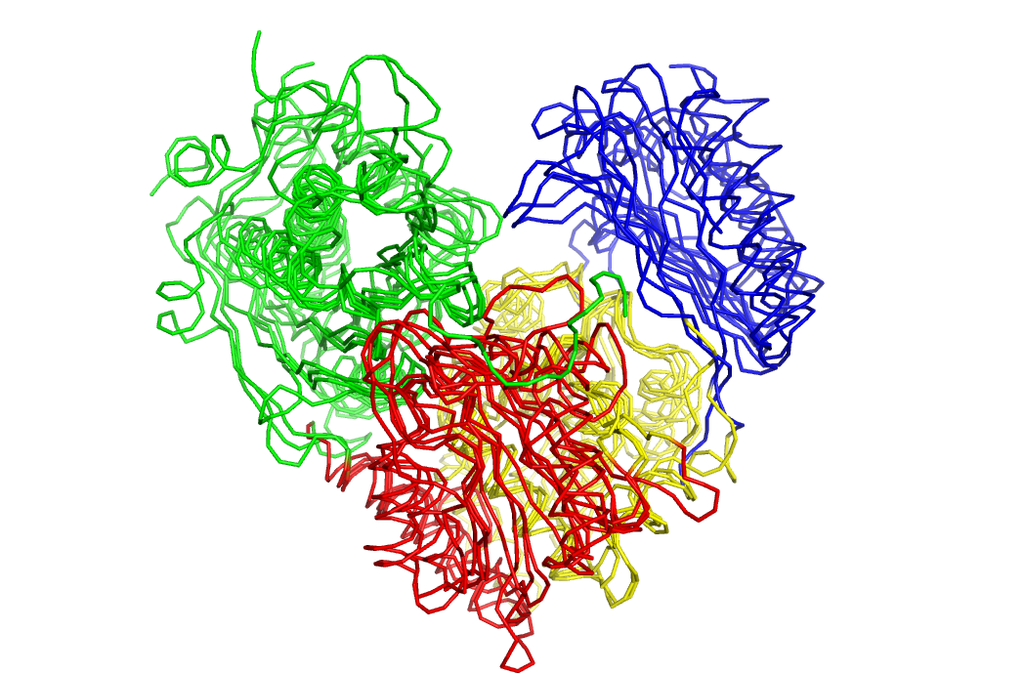
A superposition of four enzymes from the alpha D phosphohexomutase superfamily, one from each subgroup, demonstrating the structural similarity of all members in the superfamily.

However some are known to exist as dimers or tetramers in solution. Eleven crystal structures for this superfamily have been determined thus far, six of which are likely oligomers. Two distinct dimers and one tetrameric arrangement has been documented.

== Subgroups ==
There are 4 well characterized enzyme subgroups in this superfamily, which differ in their specificity for the sugar moiety of the substrate.

=== PGM ===
Phosphoglucomutase (PGM) converts D-glucose-1-phosphate into D-glucose-6-phosphate, participating in glucose breakdown & synthesis. Bacterial and eukaryotic organisms are known to have PGM enzymes, with 415 representatives currently listed in the PIR database. Among bacteria, Salmonella typhimurium and Thermus thermophilus have PGM enzymes of characterized 3D structure. In eukaryotes, PGM enzymes from Oryctolagus cuniculus (rabbit) and Paramecium tetraurelia also have been structurally characterized. The highest resolution structure is from Salmonella typhimurium (1.7 A), with PDB ID 3na5. In addition, biochemical studies have shown that PGM from S. typhimurium is a dimer in solution based on analytical ultracentrifugation and small-angle X-ray scattering (SAXS).

=== PMM/PGM ===
Phosphoglucomutase/phosphomannomutase (PGM/PMM)- Enzymes from this subgroup can use either mannose or glucose-based phosphosugar substrates with equal efficiency. PMM/PGM enzymes are found mainly in bacterial organisms, with a total of 1,331 representatives currently listed in the PIR database. These enzymes are involved in the biosynthesis of many different carbohydrates and glycolipids, which vary depending on the organism. The best studied enzyme from this subgroup is from the bacterium, Pseudomonas aeruginosa, where PMM/PGM participate in multiple biosynthetic pathways including those of lipopolysaccharide, alginate and rhamnolipid.

Structural studies of P. aeruginosa PMM/PGM by X-ray crystallography have been conducted as both apo-enzyme and as protein-ligand complexes. Based on these studies, it has been seen that when the sugar substrate binds to the enzyme there is a rotation in the C-terminal domain of the protein. This changes the active site from an open cleft in the apo-enzyme into a nearly solvent inaccessible pocket. This theme of conformational flexibility, particularly with regard to the C-terminal domain of these enzymes, has been observed in multiple proteins in the superfamily.

=== PNGM ===
Phosphoglucosamine mutase (PNGM) participates in the biosynthesis of UDP-N-acetylglucosamine (UDP-GlcNAc). This bacterial enzyme has been conserved throughout evolution and is involved in the cytoplasmic steps of peptidoglycan biosynthesis, which is essential for bacterial survival and is also not present in humans.

=== PAGM ===
Phosphoacetylglucosamine mutase (PAGM)- To date, this subgroup contains 178 members, with all known being eukaryotic. There is only one known organism with known structure, it is Candida albicans. Like PNGM, it is involved in the biosynthesis of UDP-N-acetylglucosamine. UDP-GlcNAc is a UDP sugar that works as a biosynthetic precursor of glycoproteins, mucopolysaccharides, and the cell wall of bacteria. AGM1, a characterized structure of PAGM, catalyzes the conversion of N-acetylglucosamine 6-phosphate to N-acetylglucosamine 1-phosphate. AGM1 structure was determined from Candida albicans in the apoform and complex forms with substrate and product. Like other enzymes in the superfamily, it has four domains, with two additional beta-strands in domain four and a circular permutation in domain 1.
