= Trichorrhexis =

Trichorrhexis can refer to:

- Trichorrhexis invaginata
- Trichorrhexis nodosa
