= Phosphoglucosamine mutase =

Identifiers
- EC no.: 5.4.2.10

Databases
- IntEnz: IntEnz view
- BRENDA: BRENDA entry
- ExPASy: NiceZyme view
- KEGG: KEGG entry
- MetaCyc: metabolic pathway
- PRIAM: profile
- PDB structures: RCSB PDB PDBe PDBsum
- Gene Ontology: AmiGO / QuickGO
Search
- PMC: articles
- PubMed: articles
- NCBI: proteins

In enzymology, a phosphoglucosamine mutase (EC 5.4.2.10) is an enzyme that catalyzes the chemical reaction

alpha-D-glucosamine 1-phosphate $\rightleftharpoons$ D-glucosamine 6-phosphate

Hence, this enzyme has one substrate, alpha-D-glucosamine 1-phosphate, and one product, D-glucosamine 6-phosphate.

This enzyme belongs to the family of isomerases, specifically the phosphotransferases (α-D-phosphohexomutases), which transfer phosphate groups within a molecule. The systematic name of this enzyme class is alpha-D-glucosamine 1,6-phosphomutase. This enzyme participates in aminosugars metabolism.

Crystal structures of two bacterial phosphoglucosamine mutases are known (PDB entries 3I3W and 3PDK), from Francisella tularensis and Bacillus anthracis. Both share a similar dimeric quaternary structure, as well as conserved features of the active site, as found their enzyme superfamily, the α-D-phosphohexomutases.
