= SPINK2 =

Protein-coding gene in the species Homo sapiens

Identifiers
- Aliases: SPINK2, HUSI-II, serine peptidase inhibitor, Kazal type 2, SPGF29, serine peptidase inhibitor Kazal type 2
- External IDs: OMIM: 605753; GeneCards: SPINK2
Available structures
PDB	Human UniProt search: PDBe RCSB
PDB	List of PDB id codes 2JXD

Gene location (Human)
Chr.	Chromosome 4 (human)
Band	4q12	Start	56,809,860 bp
Band	4q12	End	56,821,742 bp
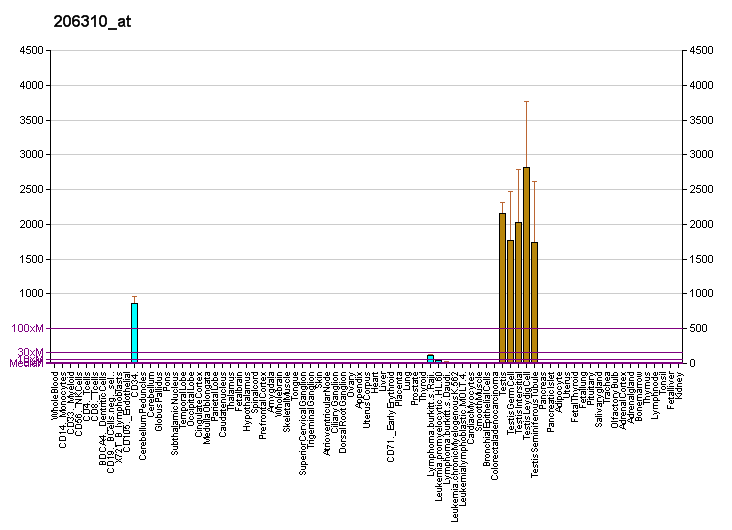
RNA expression pattern
Bgee	Human / Mouse (ortholog); Top expressed in: corpus epididymis; tail of epididymis; seminal vesicula; right testis; left testis; male germ cell; sperm; caput epididymis; gonad; testicle / n/a; More reference expression data
BioGPS	More reference expression data
Gene ontology
Molecular function	peptidase inhibitor activity; endopeptidase inhibitor activity; protein binding; serine-type endopeptidase inhibitor activity
Cellular component	extracellular region; acrosomal vesicle; extracellular space; cytoplasmic vesicle
Biological process	regulation of acrosome reaction; negative regulation of peptidase activity; negative regulation of serine-type endopeptidase activity; spermatogenesis; acrosome assembly; spermatid development
Sources:Amigo / QuickGO
Orthologs
Databases	NCBI: entry; OMA: entry
Species	Human	Mouse
Entrez	6691	n/a
Ensembl	ENSG00000128040	n/a
UniProt	P20155	n/a
RefSeq (mRNA)	NM_001271718; NM_001271719; NM_001271720; NM_001271721; NM_001271722 NM_021114	n/a
RefSeq (protein)	NP_001258647; NP_001258648; NP_001258649; NP_001258650; NP_001258651 NP_066937	n/a
Location (UCSC)	Chr 4: 56.81 – 56.82 Mb	n/a
PubMed search		n/a
- Wikidata
View/Edit Human

Serine protease inhibitor Kazal-type 2 also known as acrosin-trypsin inhibitor is a protein that in humans is encoded by the SPINK2 gene.

== See also ==
- Kazal-type serine protease inhibitor domain
