= DOCK8 deficiency =

- Other names: Combined immunodeficiency due to dedicator of cytokinesis 8 protein deficiency, CID due to DOCK8 deficiency
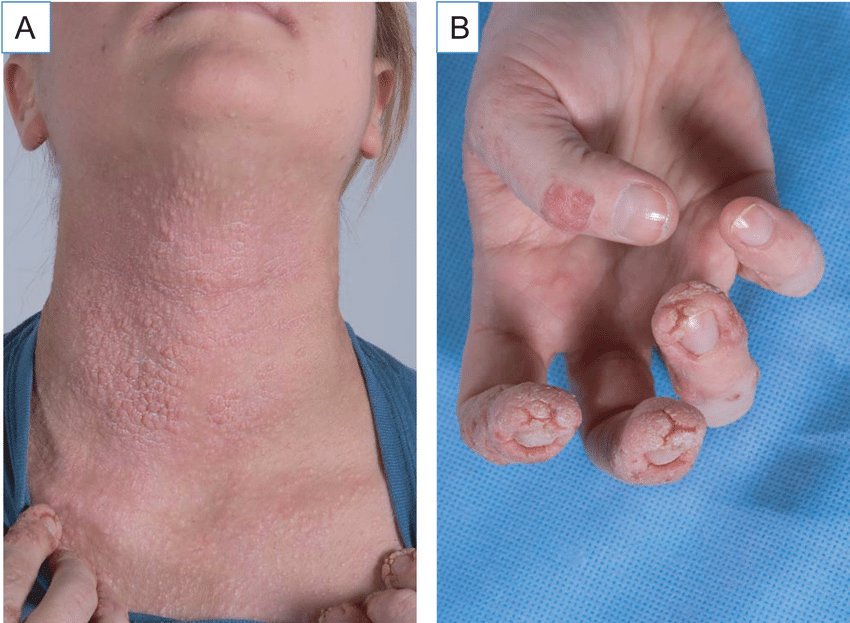
- This illustration shows a person with DOCK8 deficiency, with extensive Molluscum on the neck and warts on the fingers.

DOCK8 deficiency, also called DOCK8 immunodeficiency syndrome, is the autosomal recessive form of hyperimmunoglobulin E syndrome, a genetic disorder characterized by elevated immunoglobulin E levels, eosinophilia, and recurrent infections with staphylococcus and viruses. It is caused by a mutation in the DOCK8 gene.

== Signs and symptoms ==
The signs and symptoms of DOCK8 deficiency are similar to the autosomal dominant form, STAT3 deficiency. However, in DOCK8 deficiency, there is no skeletal or connective tissue involvement, and affected individuals do not have the characteristic facial features of those with autosomal dominant hyper-IgE syndrome. DOCK8 deficient children often have eczema, respiratory and skin staphylococcus infections.

Beyond these, many other recurrent infections have been observed, including recurrent fungal infections and recurrent viral infections (including molluscum contagiosum, herpes simplex, and herpes zoster), recurrent upper respiratory infection (including Streptococcus pneumoniae, Haemophilus influenzae, respiratory syncytial virus, and adenovirus), recurrent sinusitis, recurrent otitis media, mastoiditis, pneumonia, bronchitis with bronchiectasis, osteomyelitis, candidiasis, meningitis (caused by cryptococcus or H. influenzae), pericarditis, salmonella enteritis, and giardiasis. Other dermatologic problems include squamous-cell carcinoma/dysplasia (vulvar, anal, and facial). Immune problems are also common, including autoimmune hemolytic anemia, severe allergies (both food and environmental), asthma, and reactive airway disease. The nervous system may also be affected; observed conditions in DOCK8 deficient people include hemiplegia, ischemic stroke, subarachnoid hemorrhage, and facial paralysis. Vascular complications are common, including aortic aneurysm, cerebral aneurysm, vessel occlusion and underperfusion, and leukocytoclastic vasculitis.

== Pathophysiology ==
DOCK8, or "dedicator of cytokinesis 8", is a protein involved in regulating the actin skeleton of the cell. It may also be a tumor suppressor, since DOCK8 is lost in many cancers and people with DOCK8 deficiency are prone to developing malignancies. When it is mutated, an incorrect protein is produced, so there is, at most, a trace level of functional DOCK8 protein in the cell. There are a variety of loss-of-function mutations in DOCK8 that can cause deficiency and hyperimmunoglobulin E, including frameshift mutations, nonsense mutations, microdeletions, and, most commonly, large deletions. The low number of T cells (T cell lymphopenia) and other lymphocytes appears to be responsible for the susceptibility to infections, and the poor humoral immunity is responsible for low response to vaccines. However, how DOCK8 is involved in the loss of T cells is not known.

== Diagnosis ==
A diagnosis can only be definitively made after genetic testing to look for a mutation in the DOCK8 gene. However, it can be suspected with a high IgE level and eosinophilia. Other suggestive laboratory findings include decreased numbers of B cells, T cells, and NK cells; and hypergammaglobulinemia. It can be distinguished from autosomal dominant hyper-IgE (STAT3 deficiency) because people with DOCK8 deficiency have low levels of IgM and an impaired secondary immune response. IgG and IgA levels are usually normal to high. It can be distinguished from the similar X-linked Wiskott–Aldrich syndrome by the presence of thrombocytopenia and the consequent bloody diarrhea, as well as its pattern of inheritance. WHIM syndrome, caused by a mutation in CXCR4, is associated with similar chronic cutaneous viral infections.

== Treatment ==
Treatment in DOCK8 deficiency focuses on preventing and treating infections. Broad-spectrum antibiotics are a common mode of treatment when infection is present, though some infections (like lung abscesses) require surgical treatment. Pneumatocele may be treated with surgery, but the benefit is unclear.

Surgical treatment is also recommended for skin abscesses, along with topical and systemic antibiotics and antifungals.

Long-term treatment with systemic antibiotics, including trimethoprim/sulfamethoxazole, penicillins, and cephalosporins, is effective in preventing skin and lung infections. Other treatments used in DOCK8 deficiency include sodium cromoglycate, which improves white blood cell function, and isotretinoin, which improves skin condition.

Sometimes, Intravenous immunoglobulin is used as a treatment, but its benefits have not been proven. Levamisole is also ineffective. Mixed clinical outcomes have been found with interferon gamma and omalizumab. Two patients have been cured by bone marrow transplantation. Cyclosporine A is a current topic of research; preliminary results have shown it to be effective. Though early research on hematopoietic stem cell transplantation was equivocal, later research has shown it to improve immune function.

Patients with Combined Immunodeficiency (CID) generally experience a survival advantage when receiving hematopoietic stem cell transplantation (HSCT) prior to experiencing end-organ damage from significant infectious and inflammatory complications. This is particularly important for DOCK8 Immunodeficiency considering that some patients (30% in the study) did not fully recover their lung function due to pre-existing lung damage (typically from chronic respiratory infections) before treatment.

Fortunately, modern HSCT treatments have reported good HSCT outcomes among young adults. Furthermore, most patients had their eczema and molluscum contagiosum infections resolved or improved post HSCT treatment.

== Prognosis ==
Children with DOCK8 deficiency do not tend to live long; sepsis is a common cause of death at a young age. CNS and vascular complications are other common causes of death.

== Epidemiology ==
DOCK8 deficiency is very rare, estimated to be found in less than one person per million; there have been 32 patients diagnosed as of 2012.

== History ==
DOCK8 deficiency was first described in 2004. The mutation was discovered in 2009.
