= Trichorrhexis invaginata =

- Other names: Bamboo hair
- Specialty: Dermatology

Trichorrhexis invaginata is a distinctive hair shaft abnormality that may occur sporadically, either in normal hair or with other hair shaft abnormalities, or regularly as a marker for Netherton syndrome. The primary defect appears to be abnormal keratinization of the hair shaft in the keratogenous zone, allowing for intussusception of the fully keratinized and hard distal shaft into the incompletely keratinized and soft proximal portion of the shaft.

== Genetics ==
"Bamboo hair" is a rare autosomal recessive genodermatosis characterized by congenital ichthyosiform erythroderma, trichorrhexis invaginata, and atopic diathesis with failure to thrive. Chronic skin inflammation results in scaling and exfoliation, predisposing these patients to life-threatening infections, sepsis, and dehydration. The Netherton syndrome Mendelian Inheritance in Man is inherited as an autosomal recessive disorder due to mutations of both copies of the SPINK5 gene (localized to band 5q31-32), which encodes the serine protease inhibitor LEKTI (lymphoepithelial Kazal-type-related inhibitor). LEKTI is expressed in epithelial and mucosal surfaces and in the thymus. Each SPINK5 mutation leads to a different length of LEKTI protein, resulting in genotype/phenotype correlations in cutaneous severity, susceptibility to atopic dermatitis, growth retardation, skin infection, increased stratum corneum protease activities, and elevated kallikrein levels in the stratum corneum.

Trichorrhexis invaginata, or bamboo hair, is a hair shaft abnormality that occurs as a result of an intermittent keratinizing defect of the hair cortex. Incomplete conversion of the sulfhydryl –SH group onto S-S disulfide bonds in the protein of the cortical fibers leads to cortical softness and subsequent invagination of the fully keratinized distal hair shaft into the softer, abnormally keratinized proximal hair shaft. Intussusception of the distal hair shaft into the proximal hair shaft results in a distinctive ball-and-socket hair shaft deformity. The affected hairs are brittle and breakage is common, resulting in short hairs.

Migratory lesions of ichthyosis linearis circumflexa may be caused by a dermal influx of inflammatory cells that undergo phagocytosis and digestion by keratinocytes, resulting in disruption of keratinization.

Increased transepidermal water loss resulting from the disturbance of corneocyte barrier function in erythroderma may cause profound metabolic abnormalities and hypernatremia, particularly in neonates.

== Epidemiology ==
Approximately 200 cases of trichorrhexis invaginata (bamboo hair) have been reported in the literature, but the true incidence is not known. The incidence of trichorrhexis invaginata (bamboo hair) may be as high as 1 case in 50,000 population. Girls are affected more often by trichorrhexis invaginata (bamboo hair) than boys, but is present in all races.

== History ==
In 1937, Touraine and Solente first noted the association between hair-shaft defects (bamboo node) and ichthyosiform erythroderma. Còme first coined the term ichthyosis linearis circumflexa in 1949, although Rille had previously recorded the distinctive features of ichthyosis linearis circumflexa by 1922. In 1958, Netherton described a young girl with generalized scaly dermatitis and fragile nodular hair-shaft deformities, which he termed trichorrhexis nodosa. Later, this was more appropriately renamed as trichorrhexis invaginata (bamboo hair) for a ball-and-socket–type hair-shaft deformity at the suggestion of Wilkinson et al. In 1974, Mevorah et al. established the clinical relationship between ichthyosis linearis circumflexa and Netherton syndrome, and an atopic diathesis was found to occur in approximately 75% of patients with Netherton syndrome.

== See also ==
- Trichomegaly
- List of cutaneous conditions
