= Netherton syndrome =

- Other names: Comèl-Netherton syndrome
- Netherton syndrome has an autosomal recessive pattern of inheritance.
- Specialty: Medical genetics

Netherton syndrome is a severe, autosomal recessive genetic disorder associated with mutations in the SPINK5 gene. It is named after Earl W. Netherton (1910–1985), an American dermatologist who discovered it in 1958.

== Signs and symptoms ==
Netherton syndrome is characterized by chronic skin inflammation and pruritus (itch), severe dehydration, and stunted growth. Patients with this disorder tend to have a hair shaft defect (trichorrhexis invaginata), also known as "bamboo hair". The disrupted skin barrier function in affected individuals also presents a high susceptibility to infection and allergy, leading to the development of scaly, reddish skin similar to atopic dermatitis. In severe cases, these atopic manifestations persist throughout the individual's life, and consequently post-natal mortality rates are high. In less severe cases, this develops into the milder ichthyosis linearis circumflexa.

Netherton syndrome has recently been characterised as a primary immunodeficiency, which straddles the innate and acquired immune system, somewhat similar to Wiskott–Aldrich syndrome. A group of Netherton patients have been demonstrated to have altered immunoglobulin levels (typically high IgE and low to normal IgG) and immature natural killer cells. These natural killer cells have a reduced lytic function; which can be improved with regular infusions of immunoglobulin (see 'Treatment'); although the mechanism for this is not clear.

Patients are more prone than healthy people to infections of all types, especially recurrent skin infections with staphylococcus. They may have more severe infections; but are not as vulnerable to opportunistic pathogens as patients with true natural killer cell deficiency-type SCID.

== Cause ==
Netherton syndrome is an autosomal recessive disorder associated with mutations in the SPINK5 gene, which encodes the serine protease inhibitor lympho-epithelial Kazal-type-related inhibitor (LEKTI). These mutations result in a dysfunctional protein that has a reduced capacity to inhibit serine proteases expressed in the skin. Potential endogenous targets of LEKTI include KLK5, KLK7 and KLK14. These enzymes are involved in various aspects of epidermal remodelling, including desquamation, PAR-2 activation and degradation of lipid hydrolases, suggesting a potential mechanism for the development of atopic manifestations characteristic of Netherton syndrome.

Disease severity is determined by the level of LEKTI expression and, consequently, serine protease activity. Complete SPINK5 gene deletions have been linked to severe cases, while mutations which induce alternate splicing or create premature stop codons may lead to varying levels of severity. Furthermore, LEKTI-knockout mice exhibit a phenotype similar to Netherton syndrome in humans.

== Treatment ==
Intravenous immunoglobulin has become established as the treatment of choice in Netherton syndrome. This therapy reduces infection; enables improvement and even resolution of the skin and hair abnormalities, and dramatically improves quality of life of the patients; although exactly how it achieves this is not known.

== See also ==
- List of skin conditions
