= Etuvetidigene autotemcel =

Gene therapy medication

Clinical data
- Trade names: Waskyra
- Other names: GSK-2696275, OTL-103
- AHFS/Drugs.com: waskyra
- Routes of administration: Intravenous
- ATC code: None

Legal status
- Legal status: US: ℞-only; EU: Rx-only

Identifiers
- UNII: SMN5E7TJ9C
- KEGG: D13348

Etuvetidigene autotemcel, sold under the brand name Waskyra, is a gene therapy medication used for the treatment of Wiskott–Aldrich syndrome.

The most common side effects include rash, respiratory tract infection, febrile neutropenia, catheter related infection, vomiting, diarrhea, liver injury, and petechiae.

The active substance of etuvetidigene autotemcel consists of genetically modified autologous CD34+ hematopoietic stem cell enriched population transduced ex vivo with a lentiviral vector encoding the human Wiskott–Aldrich syndrome gene. Etuvetidigene autotemcel is a gene therapy that inserts the Wiskott–Aldrich syndrome corrected gene into the cell's genome, making the genetically modified cells capable of expressing the functional Wiskott–Aldrich syndrome protein. The genetically modified cells engraft and repopulate the hematopoietic compartment. They differentiate and produce biologically active lymphoid and myeloid progenitors whose progeny express Wiskott–Aldrich syndrome protein.

Etuvetidigene autotemcel was approved for medical use in the United States in December 2025, and in the European Union in January 2026.

== Medical uses ==
Etuvetidigene autotemcel is indicated for the treatment of people with Wiskott-Aldrich syndrome who have a mutation in the WAS gene and for whom hematopoietic stem cell transplantation is appropriate and no suitable human leukocyte antigen-matched related stem cell donor is available.

Wiskott-Aldrich syndrome is a rare, life-threatening genetic disease caused by mutations in the WAS gene. The condition is characterized by bleeding, eczema, recurrent infections, and increased susceptibility to autoimmunity and lymphoreticular malignancies.

Etuvetidigene autotemcel consists of the recipient's own hematopoietic (blood) stem cells, which have been genetically modified to include functional copies of the WAS gene. Following reduced-intensity conditioning, the gene-corrected cells are infused intravenously to restore blood cell production. Etuvetidigene autotemcel restores functional WAS protein expression in affected cells, addressing the underlying cause of the disease.

== History ==
The safety and effectiveness of etuvetidigene autotemcel was assessed based on two open-label, single-arm, multinational clinical studies and an expanded access program totaling 27 participants with severe Wiskott-Aldrich syndrome, which demonstrate substantial and sustained clinical benefit for people with severe Wiskott-Aldrich syndrome, with significant reductions in the primary disease manifestations that drive morbidity and mortality.

The US Food and Drug Administration (FDA) granted the application for etuvetidigene autotemcel orphan drug, rare pediatric disease, and regenerative medicine advanced therapy designations. The FDA granted approval of Waskyra to Fondazione Telethon ETS. It is a first approved cell and gene therapy product from a non-profit applicant.

== Society and culture ==
=== Legal status ===
Etuvetidigene autotemcel was approved for medical use in the United States in December 2025.

In November 2025, the Committee for Medicinal Products for Human Use of the European Medicines Agency adopted a positive opinion, recommending the granting of a marketing authorization for the medicinal product Waskyra, intended for the treatment of Wiskott–Aldrich syndrome. The applicant for this medicinal product is Fondazione Telethon ETS. Etuvetidigene autotemcel was authorized for medical use in the European Union in January 2026.

=== Names ===
Etuvetidigene autotemcel is the international nonproprietary name.

Etuvetidigene autotemcel is sold under the brand name Waskyra.
