= SPINK6 =

Protein found in humans

Identifiers
- Aliases: SPINK6, BUSI2, UNQ844, serine peptidase inhibitor, Kazal type 6, serine peptidase inhibitor Kazal type 6
- External IDs: OMIM: 615868; MGI: 3648654; GeneCards: SPINK6
Available structures
PDB	Ortholog search: PDBe RCSB
PDB	List of PDB id codes 2N52

Gene location (Human)
Chr.	Chromosome 5 (human)
Band	5q32	Start	148,202,794 bp
Band	5q32	End	148,215,137 bp

Gene location (Mouse)
Chr.	Chromosome 18 (mouse)
Band	18|18 B3	Start	44,204,460 bp
Band	18|18 B3	End	44,216,678 bp
RNA expression pattern
Bgee	Human / Mouse (ortholog); Top expressed in: testicle; right hemisphere of cerebellum; minor salivary glands; gonad; vagina; corpus callosum; right adrenal cortex; muscle layer of sigmoid colon; skin of leg; left coronary artery / Top expressed in: lip; embryo; embryo; zone of skin; renal cortex; muscle of thigh; human kidney; liver; More reference expression data
BioGPS	n/a
Gene ontology
Molecular function	peptidase inhibitor activity; serine-type endopeptidase inhibitor activity
Cellular component	extracellular region
Biological process	negative regulation of peptidase activity; cornification; negative regulation of serine-type endopeptidase activity
Sources:Amigo / QuickGO
Orthologs
Databases	NCBI: entry; OMA: entry
Species	Human	Mouse
Entrez	404203	433180
Ensembl	ENSG00000178172	ENSMUSG00000055095
UniProt	Q6UWN8	Q8BT20
RefSeq (mRNA)	NM_205841; NM_001195290	NM_001013797; NM_001357563; NM_001357564
RefSeq (protein)	NP_001182219; NP_995313	NP_001013819; NP_001344492; NP_001344493
Location (UCSC)	Chr 5: 148.2 – 148.22 Mb	Chr 18: 44.2 – 44.22 Mb
PubMed search
- Wikidata
View/Edit Human	View/Edit Mouse

Serine protease inhibitor Kazal-type 6 (SPINK6) is a protein encoded by the SPINK6 gene in humans. It is a potent inhibitor of epidermal proteases involved in maintaining skin homeostasis, including KLK5, KLK7 and KLK14. SPINK6 is a member of a gene family cluster located on chromosome 5q33.1, which includes SPINK5 and SPINK9.

== See also ==
- Kazal-type serine protease inhibitor domain
