= LEKTI-2 =

Mammalian protein found in Homo sapiens

SPINK9

Identifiers
- Aliases: SPINK9, LEKTI2, serine peptidase inhibitor, Kazal type 9, serine peptidase inhibitor Kazal type 9
- External IDs: OMIM: 613511; GeneCards: SPINK9

Gene location (Human)
Chr.	Chromosome 5 (human)
Band	5q32	Start	148,321,203 bp
Band	5q32	End	148,339,852 bp
RNA expression pattern
Bgee	Human / Mouse (ortholog); Top expressed in: testicle; corpus callosum; gonad; Achilles tendon; nucleus accumbens; anterior cingulate cortex; Brodmann area 9; right auricle of heart; granulocyte; fundus / n/a; More reference expression data
BioGPS	n/a
Gene ontology
Molecular function	peptidase inhibitor activity; protein binding; serine-type endopeptidase inhibitor activity
Cellular component	extracellular region; acrosomal vesicle; extracellular space
Biological process	negative regulation of peptidase activity; negative regulation of serine-type endopeptidase activity; cornification; regulation of acrosome reaction; negative regulation of endopeptidase activity
Sources:Amigo / QuickGO
Orthologs
Databases	NCBI: entry; OMA: entry
Species	Human	Mouse
Entrez	643394	n/a
Ensembl	ENSG00000204909	n/a
UniProt	Q5DT21	n/a
RefSeq (mRNA)	NM_001040433	n/a
RefSeq (protein)	NP_001035523	n/a
Location (UCSC)	Chr 5: 148.32 – 148.34 Mb	n/a
PubMed search		n/a
- Wikidata
View/Edit Human

Lympho-epithelial Kazal-type related inhibitor 2 (LEKTI-2) is a protein encoded by the SPINK9 gene in humans. SPINK9 is a member of a gene family cluster located on chromosome 5q33.1, which includes SPINK5 and SPINK6. LEKTI-2 is an inhibitor of KLK5.

== Desquamation ==
The outer layer of the epidermis is called the stratum corneum. In the stratum corneum terminally differentiated corneocytes are held together by corneodesmosomes. In order for desquamation to occur, corneodesmosomes need to be fully degraded. KLK5 and KLK7 are two serine proteases that degrade corneodesmosomes. LEKTI-2 regulates corneodesmosome degradation by inhibiting KLK5. In acral (palm and sole) skin, where desquamation needs to be delayed, SPINK9 expression is strongly upregulated. The resulting high level of LEKTI-2 delays corneodesmosome degradation, thereby allowing the epidermis to form a thick protective stratum corneum layer.

== Clinical Significance ==
SPINK9 is overexpressed in lichen simplex chronicus, actinic keratosis, and squamous cell carcinoma.

== See also ==
- Kazal-type serine protease inhibitor domain
