= CALY =

Protein-coding gene in humans

Identifiers
- Aliases: CALY, DRD1IP, NSG3, calcyon neuron specific vesicular protein
- External IDs: OMIM: 604647; MGI: 1915816; GeneCards: CALY

Gene location (Human)
Chr.	Chromosome 10 (human)
Band	10q26.3	Start	133,324,072 bp
Band	10q26.3	End	133,336,935 bp

Gene location (Mouse)
Chr.	Chromosome 7 (mouse)
Band	7|7 F4	Start	139,649,793 bp
Band	7|7 F4	End	139,662,461 bp
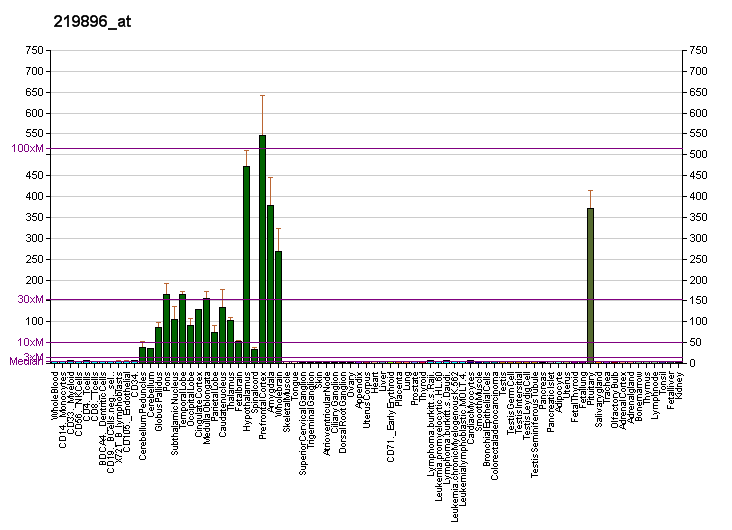
RNA expression pattern
Bgee	Human / Mouse (ortholog); Top expressed in: nucleus accumbens; right frontal lobe; hypothalamus; pituitary gland; anterior cingulate cortex; caudate nucleus; prefrontal cortex; anterior pituitary; right hemisphere of cerebellum; amygdala / Top expressed in: dentate gyrus of hippocampal formation granule cell; primary visual cortex; superior frontal gyrus; hippocampus proper; nucleus of stria terminalis; arcuate nucleus; central gray substance of midbrain; ventromedial nucleus; paraventricular nucleus of hypothalamus; dorsomedial hypothalamic nucleus; More reference expression data
BioGPS	More reference expression data
Gene ontology
Molecular function	protein binding; clathrin light chain binding; protein-containing complex binding; cargo receptor activity
Cellular component	integral component of membrane; plasma membrane; integral component of plasma membrane; cytoplasmic vesicle membrane; cytoplasmic vesicle; membrane; endosome; postsynaptic endocytic zone; glutamatergic synapse
Biological process	clathrin coat assembly; dopamine receptor signaling pathway; positive regulation of endocytosis; endocytosis; endosomal transport; postsynaptic neurotransmitter receptor internalization
Sources:Amigo / QuickGO
Orthologs
Databases	NCBI: entry; OMA: entry
Species	Human	Mouse
Entrez	50632	68566
Ensembl	ENSG00000130643	ENSMUSG00000025468
UniProt	Q9NYX4	Q9DCA7
RefSeq (mRNA)	NM_015722; NM_001321617	NM_001190385; NM_001190386; NM_026769
RefSeq (protein)	NP_001308546; NP_056537	NP_001177314; NP_001177315; NP_081045
Location (UCSC)	Chr 10: 133.32 – 133.34 Mb	Chr 7: 139.65 – 139.66 Mb
PubMed search
- Wikidata
View/Edit Human	View/Edit Mouse

Neuron-specific vesicular protein calcyon is a protein that in humans is encoded by the CALY gene. Its alternative name is Calcyon.

== Function ==
The protein encoded by this gene is a type II single transmembrane protein. It is required for maximal stimulated calcium release after stimulation of purinergic or muscarinic but not beta-adrenergic receptors. The encoded protein interacts with dopamine receptor D1 and may interact with other DA receptor subtypes and/or GPCRs.

== Interactions ==
- SPARCL1 (hevin)
