= Phosphoglucomutase 3 =

Protein-coding gene in the species Homo sapiens

PGM3

Identifiers
- Aliases: PGM3, AGM1, IMD23, PAGM, PGM 3, Phosphoglucomutase 3
- External IDs: OMIM: 172100; MGI: 97566; HomoloGene: 9205; GeneCards: PGM3; OMA:PGM3 - orthologs

Gene location (Human)
Chr.	Chromosome 6 (human)
Band	6q14.1	Start	83,161,150 bp
Band	6q14.1	End	83,193,936 bp

Gene location (Mouse)
Chr.	Chromosome 9 (mouse)
Band	9 E3.1|9 46.58 cM	Start	86,436,430 bp
Band	9 E3.1|9 46.58 cM	End	86,453,895 bp
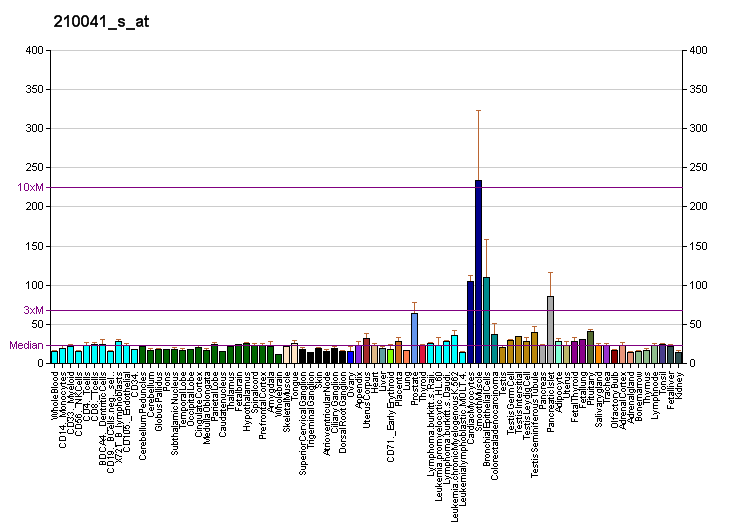

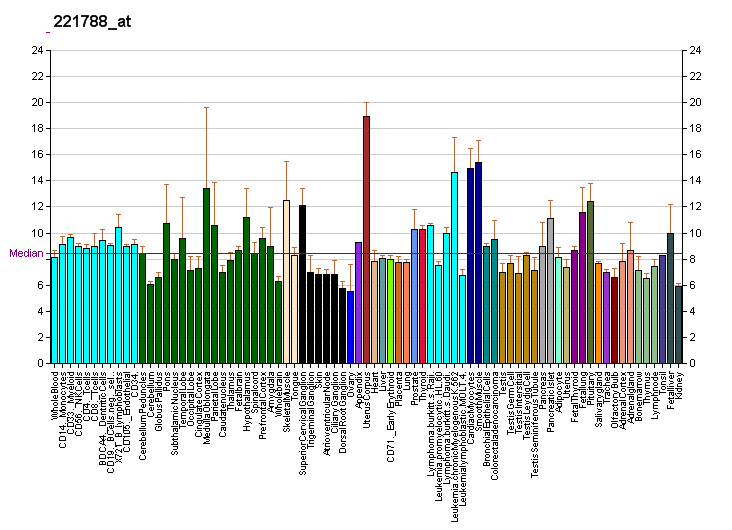
RNA expression pattern
Bgee	Human / Mouse (ortholog); Top expressed in: body of pancreas; islet of Langerhans; stromal cell of endometrium; anterior pituitary; Achilles tendon; cartilage tissue; gonad; left ovary; sperm; minor salivary glands / Top expressed in: epithelium of small intestine; seminal vesicula; umbilical cord; yolk sac; otolith organ; utricle; islet of Langerhans; proximal tubule; hand; Paneth cell; More reference expression data
BioGPS	More reference expression data
Gene ontology
Molecular function	intramolecular transferase activity, phosphotransferases; phosphoglucomutase activity; isomerase activity; magnesium ion binding; metal ion binding; phosphoacetylglucosamine mutase activity
Cellular component	cytosol; cellular component
Biological process	UDP-N-acetylglucosamine biosynthetic process; protein O-linked glycosylation; glucosamine metabolic process; protein N-linked glycosylation; glucose 1-phosphate metabolic process; organic substance metabolic process; spermatogenesis; carbohydrate metabolic process; hemopoiesis
Sources:Amigo / QuickGO
Orthologs
Species	Human	Mouse
Entrez	5238	109785
Ensembl	ENSG00000013375	ENSMUSG00000056131
UniProt	O95394	Q9CYR6
RefSeq (mRNA)	NM_001199917; NM_001199918; NM_001199919; NM_015599; NM_001367286 NM_001367287	NM_001163746; NM_028352
RefSeq (protein)	NP_001186846; NP_001186847; NP_001186848; NP_056414; NP_001354215 NP_001354216	NP_001157218; NP_082628
Location (UCSC)	Chr 6: 83.16 – 83.19 Mb	Chr 9: 86.44 – 86.45 Mb
PubMed search
- Wikidata
View/Edit Human	View/Edit Mouse

Phosphoacetylglucosamine mutase is an enzyme that in humans is encoded by the PGM3 gene.

== Clinical significance ==
Mutations in PGM3 are associated to congenital disorder of glycosylation.
