= X-linked thrombocytopenia =

- Other names: X-linked thrombocytopenia with normal platelets
- This condition is inherited in an X-linked recessive manner

X-linked thrombocytopenia, also referred to as XLT or thrombocytopenia 1, is an inherited clotting disorder that primarily affects males. It is a WAS-related disorder, meaning it is caused by a mutation in the Wiskott–Aldrich syndrome (WAS) gene, which is located on the short arm of the X chromosome. WAS-related disorders include Wiskott–Aldrich syndrome, XLT, and X-linked congenital neutropenia (XLN). Of the WAS-related disorders, X-linked thrombocytopenia is considered to be the milder phenotype. Between 1 and 10 per million males worldwide are affected with this disorder. Females may be affected with this disorder but this is very rare since females have two X chromosomes and are therefore typically carriers of the mutation.

== Symptoms and signs ==
X-linked thrombocytopenia is typically diagnosed in infancy. The disease presents as a bleeding disorder with easy bruising, mucosal bleeding, such as nosebleeds, and mild to severe anemia. Anemia is a condition in which there is an insufficient number of red blood cells to carry adequate levels of oxygen to the body's tissues. X-linked thrombocytopenia is considered to be the milder phenotype of the WAS-related disorders. As age increases, the severity of symptoms tends to decrease. However, individuals with X-linked thrombocytopenia have an increased risk for life-threatening brain hemorrhages and spontaneous bleeding.

== Causes ==
X-linked thrombocytopenia is inherited on the X chromosome. Females that are carriers will have a 50% chance of passing the WAS gene mutation on to their male offspring. Female offspring also have a 50% chance of receiving the mutated gene from their mothers and are considered carriers in that event. Males with X-linked thrombocytopenia will not pass the condition to their sons since they pass their Y chromosome on to any male offspring. However, any daughters males with this condition have will be carriers.

== Mechanism ==
X-linked thrombocytopenia primarily affects the circulatory system, specifically the platelets in the blood. Platelets are cell fragments in the blood that aid in clotting. Platelets are produced in the bone marrow. Normal platelet counts range from 150,000 to 450,000 platelets per μL of blood. Individuals with XLT usually have drastically reduced platelet counts, typically less than 70,000 platelets per μL of blood. Not only are there fewer platelets circulating, but individuals with XLT also have smaller platelets. Fewer and smaller platelets causes the efficacy of the clotting mechanism in the body to be seriously compromised, which can lead to bruising and bleeding. X-linked thrombocytopenia is caused by a mutation of the WAS gene. This mutation causes the decreased, absent, or altered Wiskott–Aldrich syndrome protein (WASp). Normal WASp is involved in relaying signals from the cell membrane to the actin cytoskeleton. If WASp is decreased, absent, or altered, then the hematopoietic cells it is found in will show signaling and cytoskeleton abnormalities.

This form of thrombocytopenia is inherited on X chromosome, thus individuals with this disorder are typically males. In regards to the sex chromosomes, males have one X chromosome and one Y chromosome while females have two X chromosomes. Because males only have one X chromosome, if they receive an X chromosome with a WAS gene mutation from their mother, then they will show phenotype of the condition. Females can be carriers for this disorder, which means that they have one normal X chromosome and one X chromosome with the WAS gene mutation. Females that are carriers do not show any signs or symptoms of X-linked thrombocytopenia.

Males with X-linked thrombocytopenia are also susceptible to severe infections, bleeding, autoimmune diseases and malignancies.

== Diagnosis ==
Aside from observing the symptoms characteristic of X-linked thrombocytopenia in infancy (easy bruising, mild anemia, mucosal bleeding), molecular genetic testing would be done to confirm the diagnosis. Furthermore, flow cytometry or western blotting would be used to test for decreased or absent amounts of WASp. Family history would also assist in diagnosis, with specific attention to maternally related males with WAS-related disorders. Because WAS-related disorders are phenotypically similar, it is important to confirm the absence of the diagnostic criteria for Wiskoff-Aldrich syndrome at the outset. These diagnostic criteria include eczema, lymphoma, autoimmune disorder, recurrent bacterial or viral infections, family history of maternally related males with a WAS-related disorder, and absent or decreased WASp. X-linked congenital neutropenia can be diagnostically distinguished from XLT with persistent neutropenia, arrested development of the bone marrow, and normal WASp expression.

== Treatment ==
Treatment for individuals with X-linked thrombocytopenia is typically focused on managing symptoms of the disorder. Splenectomy has been shown to improve platelet counts but also significantly increases the risk of life-threatening infections for patients with XLT. Therefore, these individuals must take antibiotics for the rest of their life to avoid fatal bacteremia. In the event of significant bleeding, platelet transfusions should be administered. Circumcision should be avoided for infant males with XLT due to the risk of bleeding and infection. Regular follow ups to track blood counts should be utilized as well as confirming that any medications, over the counter or prescription, will not interfere with platelet functioning.

== Prognosis ==
Recent studies have found that the life expectancy of males with XLT is not significantly affected. Individuals with XLT typically experience milder symptoms than those with other WAS-related disorders. For this reason, the long term prognosis for individuals with XLT is generally positive as long as symptoms are managed appropriately. Enhanced treatment methods in the past two decades have significantly improved the prognosis as well.

== Recent research ==
Recent research has suggested that hematopoietic stem cell transplantation may be a treatment option for patients with XLT despite associated risks. Other studies have shown that treatment with corticosteroids or intravenous immunoglobulin in any dose or duration may have a beneficial impact on platelet counts, although transiently. Furthermore, research has shown that splenectomy may not be a good treatment option for patients with XLT as it increases the risk of severe infections. This same research showed that patients with XLT have a high overall survival rate but they are at risk for severe life-threatening complications associated with this disorder, such as serious bleeding events and malignancies.
