= SPARCL1 =

Protein-coding gene in the species Homo sapiens

Identifiers
- Aliases: SPARCL1, MAST 9, MAST9, PIG33, SC1, SPARC like 1
- External IDs: OMIM: 606041; MGI: 108110; GeneCards: SPARCL1

Gene location (Human)
Chr.	Chromosome 4 (human)
Band	4q22.1	Start	87,473,335 bp
Band	4q22.1	End	87,531,061 bp

Gene location (Mouse)
Chr.	Chromosome 5 (mouse)
Band	5 E5|5 50.55 cM	Start	104,226,977 bp
Band	5 E5|5 50.55 cM	End	104,261,599 bp
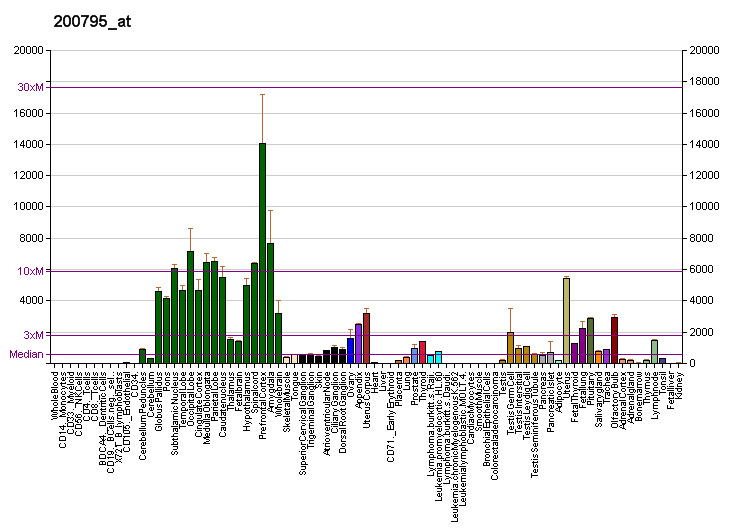
RNA expression pattern
Bgee	Human / Mouse (ortholog); Top expressed in: middle temporal gyrus; postcentral gyrus; superior frontal gyrus; Brodmann area 23; orbitofrontal cortex; external globus pallidus; Region I of hippocampus proper; occipital lobe; Brodmann area 46; primary visual cortex / Top expressed in: deep cerebellar nuclei; dorsal tegmental nucleus; medial vestibular nucleus; cerebellar vermis; ventral tegmental area; globus pallidus; pontine nuclei; dorsomedial hypothalamic nucleus; lobe of cerebellum; paraventricular nucleus of hypothalamus; More reference expression data
BioGPS	More reference expression data
Gene ontology
Molecular function	metal ion binding; calcium ion binding; collagen binding; extracellular matrix binding; protein binding
Cellular component	extracellular exosome; extracellular space; endoplasmic reticulum lumen; extracellular region; collagen-containing extracellular matrix; glutamatergic synapse
Biological process	signal transduction; anatomical structure development; post-translational protein modification; synaptic membrane adhesion
Sources:Amigo / QuickGO
Orthologs
Databases	NCBI: entry; OMA: entry
Species	Human	Mouse
Entrez	8404	13602
Ensembl	ENSG00000152583	ENSMUSG00000029309
UniProt	Q14515	P70663
RefSeq (mRNA)	NM_004684; NM_001128310; NM_001291976; NM_001291977	NM_010097; NM_001359014; NM_001359016
RefSeq (protein)	NP_001121782; NP_001278905; NP_001278906; NP_004675	NP_034227; NP_001345943; NP_001345945
Location (UCSC)	Chr 4: 87.47 – 87.53 Mb	Chr 5: 104.23 – 104.26 Mb
PubMed search
- Wikidata
View/Edit Human	View/Edit Mouse

SPARC-like protein 1 (SPARCL1 or SC1), also known as hevin (short for high endothelial venule protein), is a secreted protein with high structural similarity to SPARC.

== Biology ==
It interacts with the extracellular matrix to create intermediate states of cell adhesion. Due to its dynamic extracellular roles, it is implicated in cancer metastasis and inflammation and it is considered a matricellular protein. In humans hevin is encoded by the SPARCL1 gene. Hevin is produced by astrocytes. It is involved in synapse formation, function, plasticity, and elimination as well as brain chemistry regulation.

== Interactions ==
- CALY (calcyon)

== See also ==
- Thrombospondin
- Tenascin
