= FSTL1 =

Protein-coding gene in the species Homo sapiens

Identifiers
- Aliases: FSTL1, FRP, FSL1, MIR198, follistatin like 1, OCC-1, OCC1, tsc36
- External IDs: OMIM: 605547; MGI: 102793; GeneCards: FSTL1

Gene location (Human)
Chr.	Chromosome 3 (human)
Band	3q13.33	Start	120,392,293 bp
Band	3q13.33	End	120,450,993 bp

Gene location (Mouse)
Chr.	Chromosome 16 (mouse)
Band	16 B3|16 26.48 cM	Start	37,597,235 bp
Band	16 B3|16 26.48 cM	End	37,656,876 bp
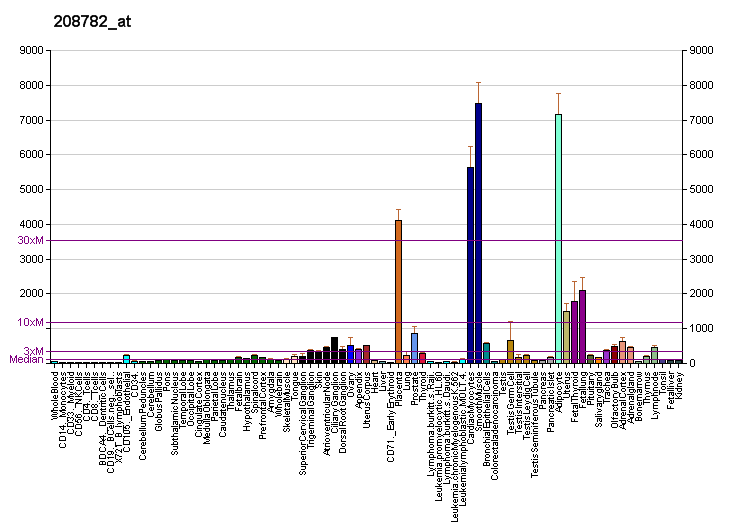
RNA expression pattern
Bgee	Human / Mouse (ortholog); Top expressed in: stromal cell of endometrium; Achilles tendon; smooth muscle tissue; gallbladder; epithelium of colon; thoracic aorta; ascending aorta; right coronary artery; Descending thoracic aorta; left coronary artery / Top expressed in: dermis; ascending aorta; vestibular sensory epithelium; epithelium of lens; semi-lunar valve; vas deferens; aortic valve; efferent ductule; tunica media of zone of aorta; gastrula; More reference expression data
BioGPS	More reference expression data
Gene ontology
Molecular function	protein binding; calcium ion binding; heparin binding
Cellular component	extracellular region; extracellular exosome; extracellular space; endoplasmic reticulum lumen
Biological process	response to starvation; BMP signaling pathway; post-translational protein modification
Sources:Amigo / QuickGO
Orthologs
Databases	NCBI: entry; OMA: entry
Species	Human	Mouse
Entrez	11167	14314
Ensembl	ENSG00000163430	ENSMUSG00000022816
UniProt	Q12841	Q62356
RefSeq (mRNA)	NM_007085	NM_008047
RefSeq (protein)	NP_009016	NP_032073
Location (UCSC)	Chr 3: 120.39 – 120.45 Mb	Chr 16: 37.6 – 37.66 Mb
PubMed search
- Wikidata
View/Edit Human	View/Edit Mouse

Follistatin-related protein 1 is a protein that in humans is encoded by the FSTL1 gene.

== Structure ==
This gene encodes a protein with similarity to follistatin, an BMP-4-binding protein. It binds to BMP-4 and TGF-β1, but not Activin A. It contains an FS module (a follistatin-like sequence containing 10 conserved cysteine residues), a Kazal-type serine protease inhibitor domain, 2 EF hand domains, and a Von Willebrand factor type C domain.

== Clinical significance ==
=== Development ===
FSTL1 has a role in development, such as lung development, ureter development, central nervous system development, and skeletal development.

=== Arthritis ===
This gene product is thought to be an autoantigen associated with rheumatoid arthritis.

FSTL1 up-regulates proinflammatory mediators important in the pathology of arthritis, and serum levels of FSTL1 correlate with severity of arthritis.

=== Cardiovascular diseases ===
FSTL1 protein seems to have a cardioprotective role. FSTL1 attenuated hypertrophy following pressure overload and prevented myocardial ischemia/reperfusion injury in a mouse or pig model of ischemia/reperfusion. Muscle-derived Fstl1 modulates vascular remodelling in response to injury.

FSTL1 has been shown to have a pronounced ability as a possible therapeutic to stimulate regeneration following myocardial infarction. Treating experimental animals (mouse and pig) with FSTL1 after myocardial infarction progressively restored heart function, at least in part by stimulating replication of normally non-dividing heart muscle cells
