= Ichthyosis linearis circumflexa =

- Specialty: Dermatology

Ichthyosis linearis circumflexa is a distinctive skin condition of generalized hyperkeratosis and polycyclic and serpiginous erythematous plaques with a characteristic, migratory, double-edged scale at the margins, and is the typical cutaneous manifestation of Netherton's syndrome.

== See also ==
- Ichthyosis prematurity syndrome
- List of cutaneous conditions
