= SPOCK2 =

Protein-coding gene in the species Homo sapiens

Identifiers
- Aliases: SPOCK2, testican-2, sparc/osteonectin, cwcv and kazal-like domains proteoglycan (testican) 2, SPARC/osteonectin, cwcv and kazal like domains proteoglycan 2, SPARC (osteonectin), cwcv and kazal like domains proteoglycan 2
- External IDs: OMIM: 607988; MGI: 1891351; GeneCards: SPOCK2

Gene location (Human)
Chr.	Chromosome 10 (human)
Band	10q22.1	Start	72,059,034 bp
Band	10q22.1	End	72,089,032 bp

Gene location (Mouse)
Chr.	Chromosome 10 (mouse)
Band	10|10 B4	Start	59,942,041 bp
Band	10|10 B4	End	59,971,020 bp
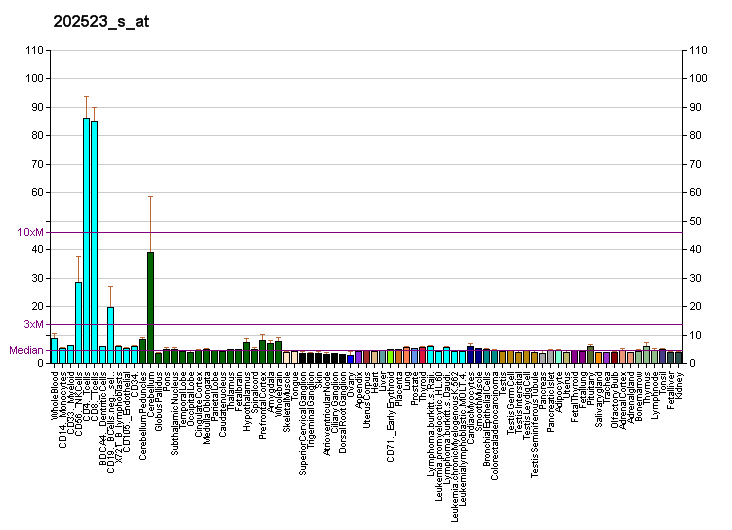

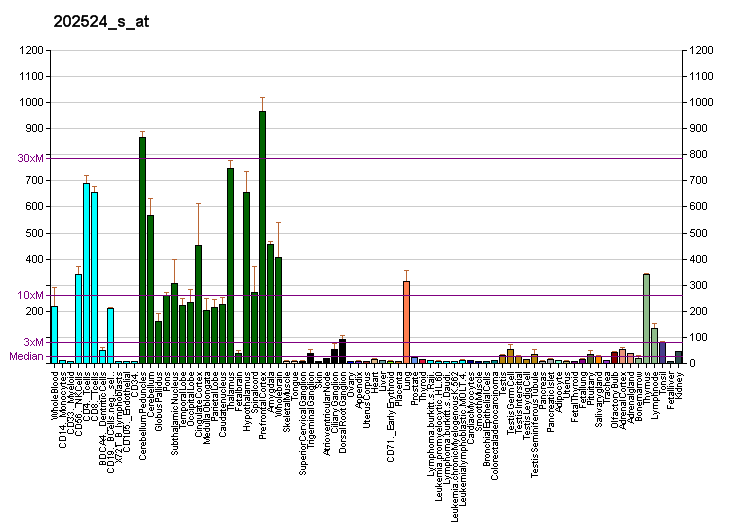
RNA expression pattern
Bgee	Human / Mouse (ortholog); Top expressed in: paraflocculus of cerebellum; lateral nuclear group of thalamus; right hemisphere of cerebellum; Brodmann area 10; spinal ganglia; cerebellar vermis; middle frontal gyrus; dorsal motor nucleus of vagus nerve; pars compacta; superior vestibular nucleus / Top expressed in: habenula; entorhinal cortex; dorsomedial hypothalamic nucleus; perirhinal cortex; superior colliculus; CA3 field; medial dorsal nucleus; central gray substance of midbrain; subiculum; dorsal tegmental nucleus; More reference expression data
BioGPS	More reference expression data
Gene ontology
Molecular function	calcium ion binding; glycosaminoglycan binding; extracellular matrix binding; metalloendopeptidase inhibitor activity; collagen binding
Cellular component	extracellular region; extracellular matrix; extracellular space
Biological process	regulation of cell differentiation; synapse assembly; peptide cross-linking via chondroitin 4-sulfate glycosaminoglycan; extracellular matrix organization; signal transduction; positive regulation of cell-substrate adhesion; negative regulation of endopeptidase activity; positive regulation of cell motility; cellular response to leukemia inhibitory factor
Sources:Amigo / QuickGO
Orthologs
Databases	NCBI: entry; OMA: entry
Species	Human	Mouse
Entrez	9806	94214
Ensembl	ENSG00000107742	ENSMUSG00000058297
UniProt	Q92563	Q9ER58
RefSeq (mRNA)	NM_001134434; NM_001244950; NM_014767	NM_052994
RefSeq (protein)	NP_001127906; NP_001231879; NP_055582	NP_443720
Location (UCSC)	Chr 10: 72.06 – 72.09 Mb	Chr 10: 59.94 – 59.97 Mb
PubMed search
- Wikidata
View/Edit Human	View/Edit Mouse

Testican-2 is a protein that in humans is encoded by the SPOCK2 gene.

== Function ==
Proteoglycans, which consist of a core protein and covalently linked glycosaminoglycans, are components of the extracellular matrix. SPOCK2 encodes a member of a novel Ca(2+)-binding proteoglycan family.[supplied by OMIM]
