= LEKTI =

Protein-coding gene in the species Homo sapiens

SPINK5
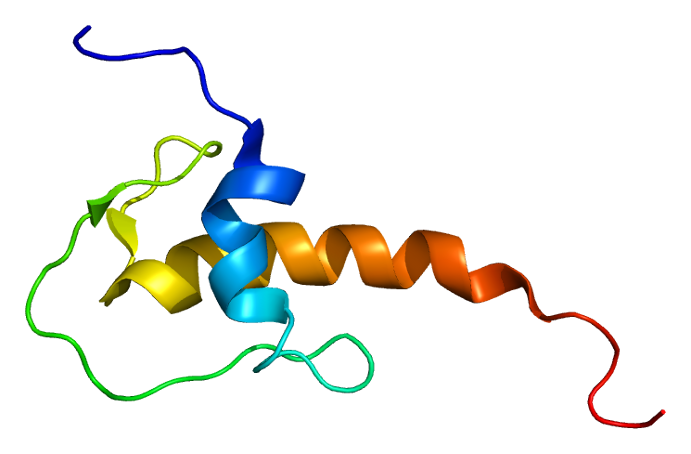

Identifiers
- Aliases: SPINK5, LEKTI, LETKI, NETS, NS, VAKTI, serine peptidase inhibitor, Kazal type 5, serine peptidase inhibitor Kazal type 5
- External IDs: OMIM: 605010; MGI: 1919682; GeneCards: SPINK5
Available structures
PDB	Ortholog search: PDBe RCSB
PDB	List of PDB id codes 1H0Z, 1HDL, 1UUC, 1UVF, 1UVG

Gene location (Human)
Chr.	Chromosome 5 (human)
Band	5q32	Start	148,025,683 bp
Band	5q32	End	148,137,382 bp

Gene location (Mouse)
Chr.	Chromosome 18 (mouse)
Band	18 B3|18 23.74 cM	Start	44,096,302 bp
Band	18 B3|18 23.74 cM	End	44,155,568 bp
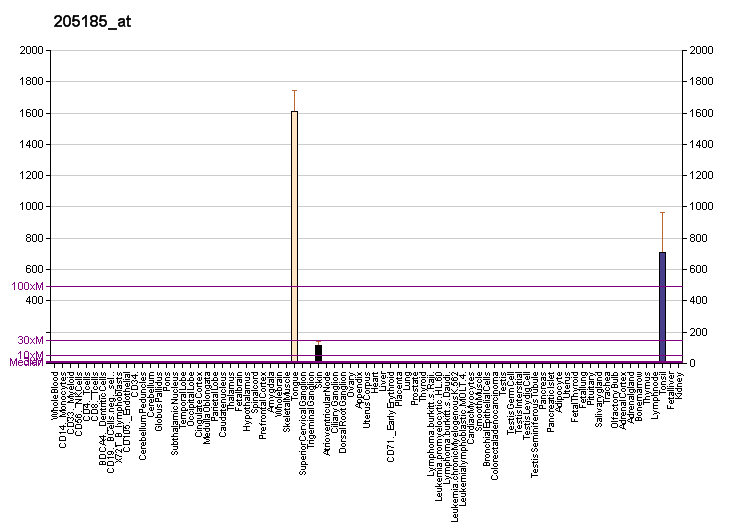
RNA expression pattern
Bgee	Human / Mouse (ortholog); Top expressed in: vulva; gums; skin of thigh; gingival epithelium; oral cavity; mucosa of pharynx; human penis; skin of hip; skin of arm; body of tongue / Top expressed in: skin of abdomen; esophagus; skin of external ear; lip; skin of back; prostate; lobe of prostate; umbilical cord; left lung lobe; stomach; More reference expression data
BioGPS	More reference expression data
Gene ontology
Molecular function	peptidase inhibitor activity; serine-type endopeptidase inhibitor activity
Cellular component	cytoplasm; cytosol; endoplasmic reticulum membrane; cell cortex; endoplasmic reticulum; perinuclear region of cytoplasm; epidermal lamellar body; extracellular region; intracellular membrane-bounded organelle
Biological process	epidermal cell differentiation; negative regulation of proteolysis; negative regulation of serine-type peptidase activity; negative regulation of peptidase activity; epithelial cell differentiation; hair cell differentiation; extracellular matrix organization; negative regulation of antibacterial peptide production; negative regulation of immune response; regulation of cell adhesion; negative regulation of angiogenesis; negative regulation of serine-type endopeptidase activity; regulation of T cell differentiation; cornification; regulation of timing of anagen
Sources:Amigo / QuickGO
Orthologs
Databases	NCBI: entry; OMA: entry
Species	Human	Mouse
Entrez	11005	72432
Ensembl	ENSG00000133710	ENSMUSG00000055561
UniProt	Q9NQ38	Q148R4
RefSeq (mRNA)	NM_001127698; NM_001127699; NM_006846	NM_001081180
RefSeq (protein)	NP_001121170; NP_001121171; NP_006837	NP_001074649
Location (UCSC)	Chr 5: 148.03 – 148.14 Mb	Chr 18: 44.1 – 44.16 Mb
PubMed search
- Wikidata
View/Edit Human	View/Edit Mouse

Lympho-epithelial Kazal-type-related inhibitor (LEKTI) also known as serine protease inhibitor Kazal-type 5 (SPINK5) is a protein that in humans is encoded by the SPINK5 gene.

== Structure and function ==
LEKTI is a large multidomain serine protease inhibitor expressed in stratified epithelial tissue. It consists of 15 domains that are cleaved into smaller, functional fragments by the protease furin. Only two of these domains (2 and 15) contain the 6 evenly spaced cysteines responsible for the 3 intramolecular disulfide bonds that are characteristic of Kazal-type related inhibitors. The remaining domains contain 4 cysteines. These disulfide bonds force the molecule into a rigid conformation that enables the protein to interact with a target protease via an extended beta-sheet. All domains (excepting 1, 2 and 15) contain an arginine at P1, indicating trypsin-like proteases are the likely targets.

In the epidermis, LEKTI is implicated in the regulation of desquamation via its ability to selectively inhibit KLK5, KLK7 and KLK14. Recombinant full length LEKTI inhibits the exogenous serine proteases trypsin, plasmin, subtilisin A, cathepsin G and human neutrophil elastase.

LEKTI may play a role in skin and hair morphogenesis and anti-inflammatory and/or antimicrobial protection of mucous epithelia.

== Gene ==
SPINK5 is a member of a gene family cluster located on chromosome 5q32, which encode inhibitors of serine proteases. This includes other epidermal proteins SPINK6 and LEKTI-2 (SPINK9). The SPINK5 gene is 61 kb in length and contains 33 exons. Alternative processing of SPINK5 results in the formation of three different gene products, which have been identified in differentiated keratinocytes.

== Clinical significance ==
Mutations in the SPINK5 gene result in Netherton syndrome, a disorder characterized by ichthyosis and specific immune system defects.

== See also ==
- Kazal-type serine protease inhibitor domain
