= FSTL3 =

Protein-coding gene in the species Homo sapiens

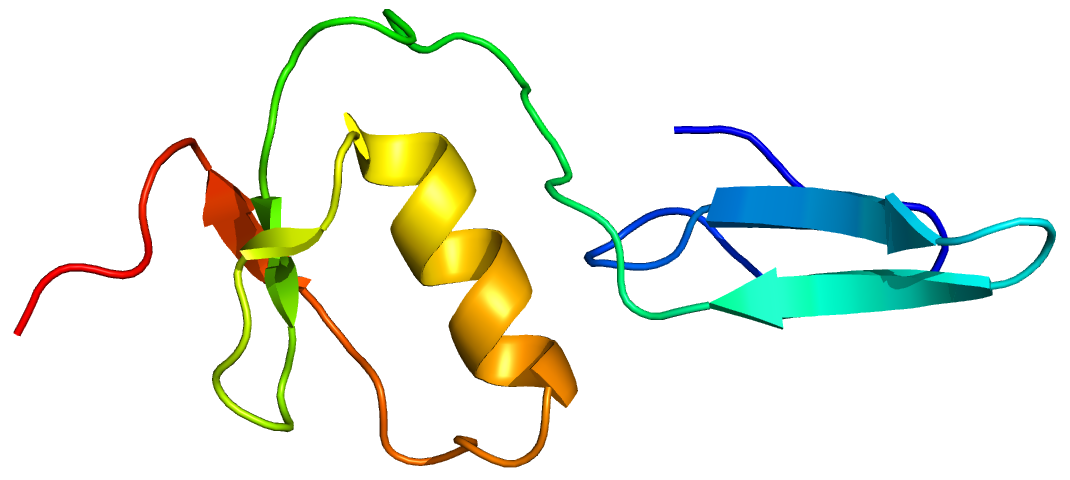
Available structures
PDB	Ortholog search: PDBe RCSB
PDB	List of PDB id codes 2KCX, 3B4V, 3SEK

Identifiers
- Aliases: FSTL3, FLRG, FSRP, follistatin like 3
- External IDs: OMIM: 605343; MGI: 1890391; HomoloGene: 4280; GeneCards: FSTL3; OMA:FSTL3 - orthologs

Gene location (Human)
Chr.	Chromosome 19 (human)
Band	19p13.3	Start	676,392 bp
Band	19p13.3	End	683,392 bp

Gene location (Mouse)
Chr.	Chromosome 10 (mouse)
Band	10|10 C1	Start	79,613,106 bp
Band	10|10 C1	End	79,618,464 bp
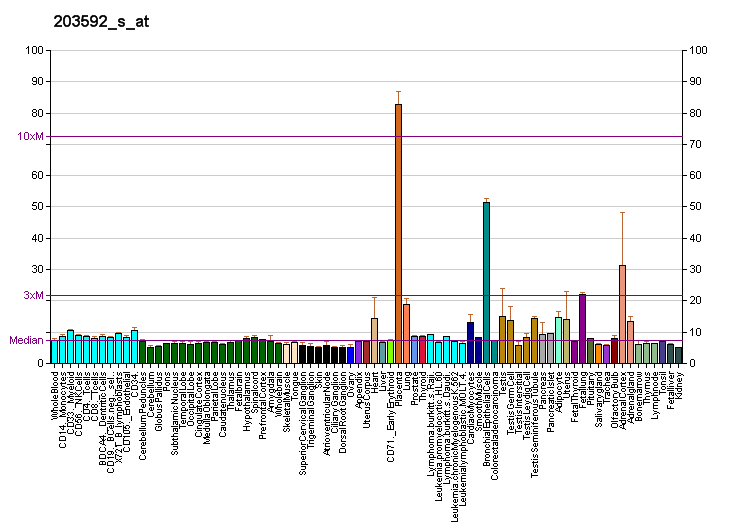
RNA expression pattern
Bgee	Human / Mouse (ortholog); Top expressed in: right coronary artery; tibial nerve; ascending aorta; left coronary artery; apex of heart; left adrenal cortex; left uterine tube; upper lobe of left lung; gastric mucosa; right adrenal gland / Top expressed in: ascending aorta; aortic valve; tunica media of zone of aorta; umbilical cord; morula; lip; decidua; efferent ductule; right lung lobe; stroma of bone marrow; More reference expression data
BioGPS	More reference expression data
Gene ontology
Molecular function	fibronectin binding; activin binding; protein binding
Cellular component	Golgi apparatus; secretory granule; nucleoplasm; extracellular region; neuron projection terminus; nucleus; extracellular space; endoplasmic reticulum lumen
Biological process	male gonad development; regulation of transcription, DNA-templated; negative regulation of transmembrane receptor protein serine/threonine kinase signaling pathway; ossification; negative regulation of osteoclast differentiation; positive regulation of cell-cell adhesion; kidney development; lung development; regulation of transcription by RNA polymerase II; adrenal gland development; transcription, DNA-templated; negative regulation of BMP signaling pathway; negative regulation of activin receptor signaling pathway; cellular response to metal ion; hematopoietic progenitor cell differentiation; spermatogenesis; positive regulation of transcription by RNA polymerase II; post-translational protein modification
Sources:Amigo / QuickGO
Orthologs
Species	Human	Mouse
Entrez	10272	83554
Ensembl	ENSG00000070404	ENSMUSG00000020325
UniProt	O95633	Q9EQC7
RefSeq (mRNA)	NM_005860	NM_031380
RefSeq (protein)	NP_005851	NP_113557
Location (UCSC)	Chr 19: 0.68 – 0.68 Mb	Chr 10: 79.61 – 79.62 Mb
PubMed search
- Wikidata
View/Edit Human	View/Edit Mouse

Follistatin-related protein 3 (also known as follistatin-like protein 3) is a protein that in humans is encoded by the FSTL3 gene.

Follistatin-like 3 is a secreted glycoprotein of the follistatin-module-protein family. It may have a role in leukemogenesis.
