= Phosphoacetylglucosamine mutase =

phosphoacetylglucosamine mutase
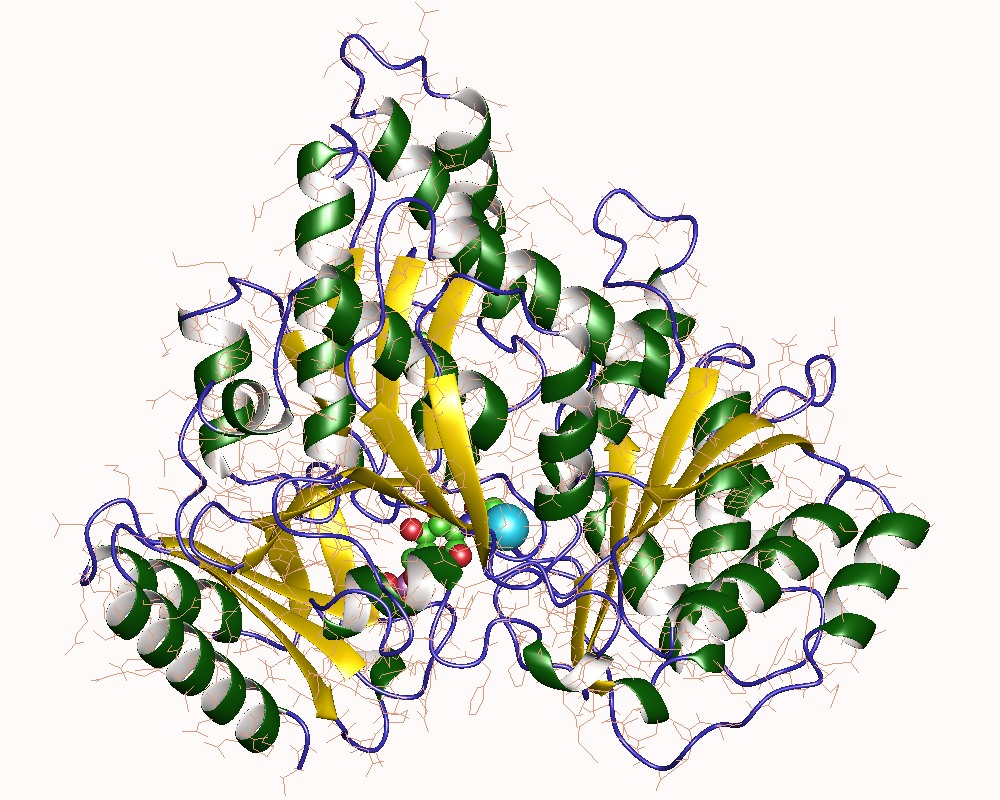
- Phosphoacetylglucosamine mutase monomer, Aspergillus lentulus

Identifiers
- EC no.: 5.4.2.3
- CAS no.: 9027-51-4

Databases
- IntEnz: IntEnz view
- BRENDA: BRENDA entry
- ExPASy: NiceZyme view
- KEGG: KEGG entry
- MetaCyc: metabolic pathway
- PRIAM: profile
- PDB structures: RCSB PDB PDBe PDBsum
- Gene Ontology: AmiGO / QuickGO
Search
- PMC: articles
- PubMed: articles
- NCBI: proteins

In enzymology, a phosphoacetylglucosamine mutase (EC 5.4.2.3) is an enzyme that catalyzes the chemical reaction

N-acetyl-alpha-D-glucosamine 1-phosphate $\rightleftharpoons$ N-acetyl-D-glucosamine 6-phosphate

Hence, this enzyme has one substrate, N-acetyl-alpha-D-glucosamine 1-phosphate, and one product, N-acetyl-D-glucosamine 6-phosphate.

This enzyme belongs to the family of isomerases, specifically the phosphotransferases (phosphomutases), which transfer phosphate groups within a molecule. The systematic name of this enzyme class is N-acetyl-alpha-D-glucosamine 1,6-phosphomutase. Other names in common use include acetylglucosamine phosphomutase, acetylglucosamine phosphomutase, acetylaminodeoxyglucose phosphomutase, phospho-N-acetylglucosamine mutase, and N-acetyl-D-glucosamine 1,6-phosphomutase. This enzyme participates in aminosugars metabolism. This enzyme has at least one effector, N-Acetyl-D-glucosamine 1,6-bisphosphate.

== Structural studies ==
As of late 2007, 4 structures have been solved for this class of enzymes, with PDB accession codes 1WJW, 2DKA, 2DKC, and 2DKD.
