= SLCO1A2 =

Protein-coding gene in the species Homo sapiens

An Error has occurred retrieving Wikidata item for infobox Solute carrier organic anion transporter family member 1A2 is a protein that in humans is encoded by the SLCO1A2 gene.

This gene encodes a sodium-independent transporter which mediates cellular uptake of organic ions in the liver. Its substrates include bile acids, bromosulphophthalein, and some steroidal compounds. The protein is a member of the SLC21A family of solute carriers. Alternate splicing of this gene results in three transcript variants encoding two different isoforms.

== See also ==
- Solute carrier family
