= SLCO4A1 =

Protein-coding gene in the species Homo sapiens

An Error has occurred retrieving Wikidata item for infobox Solute carrier organic anion transporter family member 4A1 is a protein that in humans is encoded by the SLCO4A1 gene.

== See also ==
- Solute carrier family
