= SLCO3A1 =

Protein-coding gene in the species Homo sapiens

Identifiers
- Aliases: SLCO3A1, OATP-D, OATP3A1, OATPD, SLC21A11, OATP-RP3, OATPRP3, solute carrier organic anion transporter family member 3A1
- External IDs: OMIM: 612435; MGI: 1351867; GeneCards: SLCO3A1

Gene location (Human)
Chr.	Chromosome 15 (human)
Band	15q26.1	Start	91,853,708 bp
Band	15q26.1	End	92,172,435 bp

Gene location (Mouse)
Chr.	Chromosome 7 (mouse)
Band	7|7 D1	Start	73,925,167 bp
Band	7|7 D1	End	74,204,528 bp
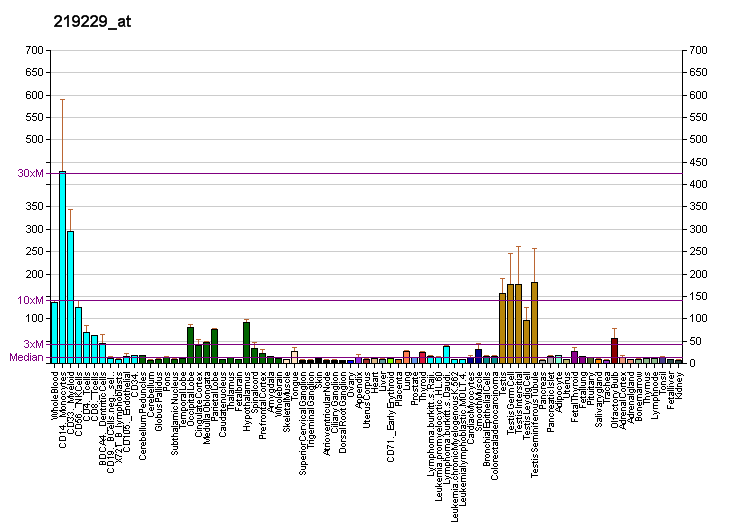
RNA expression pattern
Bgee	Human / Mouse (ortholog); Top expressed in: buccal mucosa cell; endothelial cell; C1 segment; inferior ganglion of vagus nerve; blood; left testis; right testis; sperm; corpus callosum; visceral pleura / Top expressed in: superior cervical ganglion; right kidney; primary oocyte; secondary oocyte; proximal tubule; interventricular septum; motor neuron; cumulus cell; zygote; right lung lobe; More reference expression data
BioGPS	More reference expression data
Gene ontology
Molecular function	transporter activity; sodium-independent organic anion transmembrane transporter activity
Cellular component	integral component of membrane; plasma membrane; membrane; integral component of plasma membrane
Biological process	ion transport; prostaglandin transport; sodium-independent organic anion transport; transmembrane transport
Sources:Amigo / QuickGO
Orthologs
Databases	NCBI: entry; OMA: entry
Species	Human	Mouse
Entrez	28232	108116
Ensembl	ENSG00000176463	ENSMUSG00000025790
UniProt	Q9UIG8	Q8R3L5
RefSeq (mRNA)	NM_001145044; NM_013272	NM_001038643; NM_023908
RefSeq (protein)	NP_001138516; NP_037404	NP_001033732; NP_076397
Location (UCSC)	Chr 15: 91.85 – 92.17 Mb	Chr 7: 73.93 – 74.2 Mb
PubMed search
- Wikidata
View/Edit Human	View/Edit Mouse

Solute carrier organic anion transporter family member 3A1 is a protein that in humans is encoded by the SLCO3A1 gene.

== See also ==
- SLCO3A1+protein,+human at the U.S. National Library of Medicine Medical Subject Headings (MeSH)
