= SLCO4C1 =

Mammalian protein found in Homo sapiens

An Error has occurred retrieving Wikidata item for infobox

Solute carrier organic anion transporter family member 4C1 is a protein that in humans is encoded by the SLCO4C1 gene, which is located on chromosome 5q21. The OATP4C1 protein is expressed in the basolateral membrane of the nephron of the human kidney, where it is involved in the uptake of organic anions for elimination in the urine. The drug digoxin is an important substrate of this transporter.

== Function ==
SLCO4C1 belongs to the organic anion transporter (OATP) family. OATPs are involved in the membrane transport of bile acids, conjugated steroids, thyroid hormone, eicosanoids, peptides, and numerous drugs in many tissues (Mikkaichi et al., 2004 [PubMed 14993604]).
