= Wiskott–Aldrich syndrome =

Medical condition

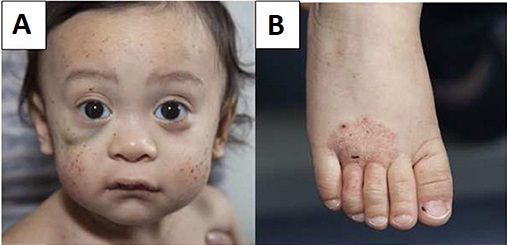
- A) Multiple face petechiae and a hematoma under the right eye (left in image). B) Eczema of the foot.
- Specialty: Immunology

Wiskott–Aldrich syndrome (WAS) is a rare X-linked recessive disease characterized by eczema, thrombocytopenia (low platelet count), immune deficiency, and bloody diarrhea (secondary to the thrombocytopenia). It is also sometimes called the eczema-thrombocytopenia-immunodeficiency syndrome in keeping with Aldrich's original description in 1954. The WAS-related disorders of X-linked thrombocytopenia (XLT) and X-linked congenital neutropenia (XLN) may present with similar but less severe symptoms and are caused by mutations of the same gene.

== Signs and symptoms ==
WAS occurs most often in males due to its X-linked recessive pattern of inheritance, affecting between 1 and 10 males per million. The first signs are usually petechiae and bruising, resulting from a low platelet count (i.e. thrombocytopenia). Spontaneous nose bleeds and bloody diarrhea are also common and eczema typically develops within the first month of life. Recurrent bacterial infections typically develop by three months of age. The majority of children with WAS develop at least one autoimmune disorder, and cancers (mainly lymphoma and leukemia) develop in up to a third of patients. Immunoglobulin M (IgM) levels are reduced, IgA and IgE are elevated, and IgG levels can be normal, reduced, or elevated. In addition to thrombocytopenia, WAS patients have abnormally small platelets (i.e. microthrombocytes) and ~30% also have elevated eosinophil counts (i.e. eosinophilia).

== Pathophysiology ==
The microthrombocytes seen in WAS patients have only been observed in one other condition, ARPC1B deficiency. In both conditions the defective platelets are thought to be removed from circulation by the spleen and/or liver, leading to low platelet counts. WAS patients have increased susceptibility to infections, particularly of the ears and sinuses, and this immune deficiency has been linked to decreased antibody production and the inability of immune T cells to effectively combat infection.

=== Genetics ===
Wiskott–Aldrich syndrome has an X-linked recessive pattern of inheritance.

WAS is associated with mutations in a gene on the short arm of the X chromosome (Xp11.23) that was originally termed the Wiskott–Aldrich syndrome protein gene and is officially known as WAS (Gene ID: 7454). X-linked thrombocytopenia (XLT) is also linked to pathogenic variants in the WAS gene, although some variants tend to be more strongly associated with XLT versus others that are more associated with WAS. The rare disorder X-linked neutropenia has also been linked to a specific subset of WAS mutations.

The protein product of WAS is known as WASp. It contains 502 amino acids and is mainly expressed in hematopoietic cells (the cells in the bone marrow that develop into blood cells). The main function of WASp is to activate actin polymerization by serving as a nucleation-promoting factor (NPF) for the Arp2/3 complex, which generates branched actin filaments. Several proteins can serve as NPFs, and it has been observed that in WAS platelets the Arp2/3 complex functions normally, indicating that WASp is not required for its activation in platelets. In T-cells, WASp is important because it is known to be activated via T-cell receptor signaling pathways to induce cortical actin cytoskeleton rearrangements that are responsible for forming the immunological synapse.

The severity of the symptoms produced by pathogenic variants in the WAS gene generally correlates with their effects on WASp. Missense variants generally are associated with less severe disease than truncating variants that produce no protein due to nonsense-mediated decay. However, this correlation is not perfect, and sometimes the same variant can be seen both in XLT and in WAS (sometimes within two different members of the same family), a concept in genetics referred to as variable expressivity. Although autoimmune disease and malignancy may occur in both conditions, patients with loss of WASp are at higher risk. A defect in the CD43 molecule has also been found in WAS patients. CD43, a transmembrane sialoglycoprotein also known as a leukosialin, is part of a greater complex involved in T-cell activation and acts as a sensitive indicator of abnormal, malignant B cell populations. Defects in this molecule may be detrimental to WAS patients, who are at a much higher risk of autoimmune diseases that may be exacerbated in later-detected B-cell lymphomas.

== Diagnosis ==
The diagnosis can be made on the basis of clinical findings, the peripheral blood smear, and low immunoglobulin levels. Typically, IgM levels are low, IgA levels are elevated, and IgE levels may be elevated; paraproteins are occasionally observed. Skin immunologic testing (allergy testing) may reveal hyposensitivity. Individuals with Wiskott–Aldrich syndrome, however, are at higher risk for severe food allergies. Not all patients have a positive family history of the disorder; new mutations do occur. Often, leukemia may be suspected on the basis of low platelets and infections, and bone marrow biopsy may be performed. Decreased levels of WASp are typically observed. The current gold standard for diagnosis is DNA sequence analysis, which can detect WAS and the related disorders XLT and XLN in 95% of patients and carriers.

Diagnostic criteria for Wiskott–Aldrich syndrome
| Mandatory criteria | Low platelets, known as thrombocytopenia (<70,000 platelets/mm3) on two separate tests, AND; Small platelets (platelet volume <7.5 fL) |
| Definitive | Pathogenic WAS variant (or deletion) detected on genetic testing, OR; Absent or reduced WAS expression via Northern blot analysis of lymphocytes from a fresh blood sample, OR; Absent or reduced WAS protein in lymphocytes, OR; Maternal family history of Wiskott–Aldrich syndrome or a WAS-related disorder (X-linked thrombocytopenia or X-linked congenital neutropenia) |
| Probable | Eczema, OR; Recurrent infections (either viral or bacterial), OR; Autoimmune diseases (including hemolytic anemia, vasculitis, arthritis, inflammatory bowel disease, and IgA nephropathy), OR; Cancer (lymphoma, leukemia, or brain tumor), OR; Abnormal antibody response to polysaccharide antigens and/or low isohemagglutinins (antibodies against foreign blood cells responsible for ABO incompatibility) |
| Possible | Same as above, but had spleen removal (a treatment for thrombocytopenia) so may no longer meet mandatory criteria, OR; Mandatory criteria only |

=== Classification ===
Jin et al. (2004) employ a numerical grading of severity: This score, which ranges from 0 to 5, may have clinical utility for predicting disease severity. Those with higher WAS scores (e.g., 5) at younger ages (e.g., age less than 5 years old), are thought to be at highest risk for increased morbidity and mortality related to their condition. As individuals can develop more WAS-related symptoms (e.g. autoimmune disease, malignancy) with age, one's WAS score can increase over time. A lower WAS score may be more compatible with conservative management versus higher WAS scores that may favor intervention with treatments such as hematopoietic stem cell transplant.

WAS clinical score
| Score | Definition | Clinical syndrome |
|---|---|---|
| 0 | Neutropenia (low white blood cell count) or myelodysplasia only | X-linked neutropenia (XLN) |
| 0.5 | Intermittent thrombocytopenia (low platelet counts sometimes but not always) | X-linked thrombocytopenia (XLT) |
| 1 | Thrombocytopenia and small platelets (microthrombocytopenia) | XLT |
| 2 | Microthrombocytopenia plus normally responsive eczema or occasional upper respiratory tract infections | XLT |
| 2.5 | Microthrombocytopenia plus therapy-responsive but severe eczema or airway infections requiring antibiotics | XLT/Wiskott–Aldrich syndrome (WAS) |
| 3 | Microthrombocytopenia plus both eczema and airway infections requiring antibiotics | WAS |
| 4 | Microthrombocytopenia plus eczema continuously requiring therapy and/or severe or life-threatening infections | WAS |
| 5 | Microthrombocytopenia plus autoimmune disease or malignancy | XLT/WAS + autoimmune disease or cancer |

== Treatment ==
=== Hematopoietic stem cell transplant ===
Treatment of Wiskott–Aldrich syndrome depends on the severity of the disease. WAS is primarily a disorder of the blood-forming tissues, so in cases of severe disease (WAS score 3–5) the only widely available curative treatment currently available is a hematopoietic stem cell transplant (HCT). In this procedure, stem cells are harvested from umbilical cord blood, bone marrow, or peripheral blood following treatment with medications that cause stem cells to leave the bone marrow and circulate systemically. The best outcomes are with HLA-identical or similar donors (often siblings). In cases of milder disease the potential benefits of HCT (>90% probability of cure if transplant occurs before age two) must be considered in the context of non-trivial risks presented by the procedure itself and the potential need for lifelong immunosuppression to prevent graft-versus-host disease. Generally, outcomes are better if HCT occurs prior to the development of autoimmune disease or malignancy; however, there are risks associated with chemotherapy (needed to make room for the new stem cells) especially in young infants (risk of a second cancer, or infertility).

Bleeding complications

Otherwise WAS treatment is focused on managing symptoms and preventing complications. The greatest mortality risk in WAS before age 30 is from bleeding so aspirin and other nonsteroidal anti-inflammatory drugs that may interfere with already compromised platelet function should generally be avoided. Circumcision, as well as elective surgeries, should generally be deferred in males with thrombocytopenia until after HCT if possible. Protective helmets can help protect children from life-threatening intracranial hemorrhage (brain bleed) which could result from head injuries. Patients may require platelet transfusions when there is extreme blood loss (such as during surgery) or for very low platelets; splenectomy (removal of the spleen) may also be lifesaving. However, splenectomy is generally considered palliative and is not universally recommended in WAS because it can increase the risk of life-threatening infections. Post-splenectomy patients will require lifelong antibiotic prophylaxis to prevent infections. Study of eltrombopag, a thrombopoietic agent used to increase platelets in immune thrombocytopenic purpura (ITP), in WAS concluded that although it increased platelet numbers, it failed to increase platelet activation in most patients. It has since been proposed that eltrombopag may be used to bridge to HCT in patients with severe thrombocytopenia to normalize platelet numbers without transfusions and decrease bleeding events. Anemia from bleeding may require iron supplementation or blood transfusion. Regular surveillance of blood counts is recommended.

Infections and autoimmune disease

For patients with frequent infections, intravenous immunoglobulins (IVIG) or subcutaneous immunoglobulins can be regularly scheduled to boost the immune system. Adequacy of IVIG replacement can be assessed via periodic lab draws. WAS patients with immune system compromise may benefit from antibiotic prophylaxis, for example by taking trimethoprim-sulfamethoxazole to prevent Pneumocystis jirovecii–related pneumonia. Similarly, prophylactic antibiotic use may also be considered in patients with recurrent bacterial sinus or lung infections. When there are signs or symptoms of an infection, prompt and thorough evaluation is important including blood cultures to guide therapy (often IV antibiotics). Live vaccines (such as MMR or rotavirus) should be avoided during routine childhood vaccination. Inactivated vaccines may be given safely but may not provide protective levels of immunity. Eczema is generally treated with topical steroids, and if chronic skin infections exacerbate eczema an antibiotic may also be given. Autoimmune disease is managed with judicious use of appropriate immunosuppressants.

Gene therapy

A gene therapy for Wiskott–Aldrich syndrome using a lentivirus has been tested in clinical trials. Proof-of-principle for successful hematopoietic stem cell gene therapy has been provided for patients with Wiskott–Aldrich syndrome. In July 2013, the Italian San Raffaele Telethon Institute for Gene Therapy (HSR-TIGET) reported that three children with Wiskott–Aldrich syndrome showed significant improvement (improved platelet counts, immune function, and clinical symptoms) 20–30 months after being treated with a genetically modified lentivirus. In April 2015, results from a follow-up British and French trial showed that six out of seven individuals showed improvement of immune function and clinical symptoms an average of 27 months after treatment with gene therapy. Importantly, neither study showed evidence of leukemic proliferation following treatment, a complication of early attempts at gene therapy using a retroviral vector. It is unknown why these gene therapies did not restore normal platelet numbers, but gene therapy treatment was still associated with transfusion-independence and a significant reduction in bleeding events.

Etuvetidigene autotemcel (Waskyra) was approved for medical use in the United States in December 2025. It is the first gene therapy developed by a non-profit to be approved in the US.

== Prognosis ==
Outcomes from Wiskott–Aldrich syndrome are variable and depend on how severely an individual is affected (the WAS score may be used to assess disease severity). The milder end of the disease spectrum associated with the WAS gene is referred to as X-linked neutropenia or X-linked thrombocytopenia, and the latter is thought to have a normal life expectancy with reports of minimally affected males surviving into their seventh decade without treatment. Traditionally, however, Wiskott–Aldrich syndrome has been associated with premature death from causes including bleeding, infections, or malignancy. Wiskott–Aldrich syndrome is a condition with variable expressivity, meaning that even within the same family some may exhibit only chronic thrombocytopenia while others experience severe, life-threatening complications of Wiskott–Aldrich syndrome in infancy or childhood. Given that symptoms often progress with age, it is challenging to predict how affected a newly diagnosed infant will eventually be. There is some genotype-phenotype correlation, with most individuals with X-linked thrombocytopenia having missense variants in the WAS gene versus 86.5% of those that make no WAS protein having the classic Wiskott–Aldrich syndrome phenotype. Overall the prognosis for individuals with Wiskott–Aldrich syndrome has improved considerably over the past decades due to earlier diagnoses and more access to treatments.

== Epidemiology ==
The estimated incidence of Wiskott–Aldrich syndrome in the United States is one in 250,000 live male births. While still a rare disease, this makes it more common than many genetic immunodeficiency syndromes such as hyper-IgM syndrome or SCID, which have an estimated incidence of about one in 1,000,000 live births, and Wiskott–Aldrich syndrome is thought to account for 1.2% of all inherited immunodeficiencies in the United States. WAS occurs worldwide and is not known to be more common in any particular ethnic group.

== History ==
=== Name origins ===
The syndrome is named after Dr. Alfred Wiskott (1898–1978), a German pediatrician who first noticed the syndrome in 1937, and Dr. Robert Anderson Aldrich (1917–1998), an American pediatrician who described the disease in a family of Dutch-Americans in 1954. Wiskott described three brothers with a similar disease, whose sisters were unaffected. In 2006, a German research group analyzed family members of Wiskott's three cases, and surmised they probably shared a novel frameshift mutation of the first exon of the WASp gene.

=== Rademacher's disease ===
In 1959, physicians evaluated 19-year-old David Rademacher to determine whether he might have an adult form of Aldrich syndrome, now known as Wiskott–Aldrich syndrome. The case is historically notable for its close resemblance to WAS, with immunologic differences that led physicians to classify it separately at the time.

Rademacher suffered from many overlapping symptoms typically displayed in Aldrich syndrome, including eczema, easy bruising, abnormal bleeding, thrombocytopenia, and recurrent serious infections from infancy, with symptoms beginning at about three months of age. His family history strongly suggested a sex-linked recessive disorder on his maternal side, as physicians noted he had three maternal uncles who died in infancy from "bloody diarrhea" and one maternal cousin who died with eczema, giant cell pneumonia, and thrombocytopenia.

The combination of eczema, thrombocytopenia, excessive bleeding, recurrent infections, and an apparently X-linked family history led physicians to note that it closely resembled the clinical syndrome described by Robert Aldrich in 1954. In response, they studied Rademacher's immune response to extensive antigenic stimulation after temporarily discontinuing gamma globulin therapy. Despite such, physicians detected no antibody response to any of the antigens administered; a stark difference from the Aldrich syndrome cases of the time, which had been able to produce antibodies following bacterial and viral antigenic stimulation.

Additionally, while abnormally small platelets are a key feature of WAS, the report on Rademacher did not document the patient's platelet size, leaving this important point of comparison a mystery. Another abnormality in the case was that the patient's immunoglobulin A (IgA) was reported to be completely absent from his body based on their findings, which is an important antibody for protecting mucosal surfaces such as the gastrointestinal and respiratory tracts.

David Rademacher died in 1960 at the age of 20 from lymphoma, which has since been found to be associated with WAS as well. Autopsy findings also included pneumococcal pneumonia with bacteremia as part of his terminal illness, alongside the widespread reticulum cell sarcoma, interpreted histologically as a large-cell lymphoma.

Physicians concluded that Rademacher shared characteristics with Aldrich syndrome and other congenital immunodeficiencies, though too atypical to fit within any known syndrome. Considering the disease appeared so unique, they named the disease after him: Rademacher's disease. The case was ultimately published in 1962 in The American Journal of Medicine, titled "Rademacher’s Disease: Diminished Immunity of an Unusual Form Complicated by Lymphadenopathy."

Since then, the WAS gene went on to be identified in 1994, and research has developed a broader understanding of the clinical spectrum of Wiskott–Aldrich syndrome. While there have since been some rare WAS cases in which patients showed no antibody response to individual administered antigens, the Rademacher report documented a complete failure to demonstrate an antibody response across an unusually broad panel of unrelated administered antigens. What also remains notably curious is the reported absence of IgA, while the platelet size remains an important yet unknown factor.

Without preserved biological material in the case being tested through modern genetic sequencing, however, it is impossible to know for sure whether this was an unusually severe, atypical presentation of Wiskott–Aldrich, WAS complicated by an additional immunological disorder, or still another genetic disorder independent of Wiskott–Aldrich that has yet to be clearly identified in any other documented cases.
