= Permissiveness (endocrinology) =

In endocrinology, permissiveness is a biochemical phenomenon in which the presence of one hormone is required in order for another hormone to exert its full effects on a target cell. Hormones can interact in permissive, synergistic, or antagonistic ways. The chemical classes of hormones include amines, polypeptides, glycoproteins and steroids. Permissive hormones act as precursors to active hormones and may be classified as either prohormones or prehormones. It stimulate the formation of receptors of that hormone.

== Examples ==
Thyroid hormone increases the number of beta-adrenergic receptors available for epinephrine at the latter's target cell, thereby increasing epinephrine's effect on that cell. Specially in cardiac cell. Without the thyroid hormone, epinephrine would have only a weak effect.

Cortisol is required for the response of vascular and bronchial smooth muscle to catecholamines. Cortisol is also required for the lipolytic effect of catecholamines, ACTH, and growth hormone on fat cells. Cortisol is also required for the calorigenic effects of glucagon and catecholamines.

The effects of a hormone in the body depend on its concentration. Permissive actions of glucocorticoids like cortisol generally occur at low concentrations. Abnormally high amounts of a hormone can result in atypical effects. Glucocorticoids function by attaching to cytoplasmic receptors to either enhance or suppress changes in the transcription of DNA and thus the synthesis of proteins. Glucocorticoids also inhibit the secretion of cytokines via post-translational modification effects.
