= Preprohormone =

Precursor protein to one or more prohormones

A preprohormone is the precursor protein to one or more prohormones, which are in turn precursors to peptide hormones. In general, the protein consists of the amino acid chain that is created by the hormone-secreting cell, before any changes have been made to it. It contains a signal peptide, the hormone(s) itself (themselves), and intervening amino acids. Before the hormone is released from the cell, the signal peptide and other amino acids are removed.

== See also ==
- Prehormone
