= Kallidin =

Peptide hormone

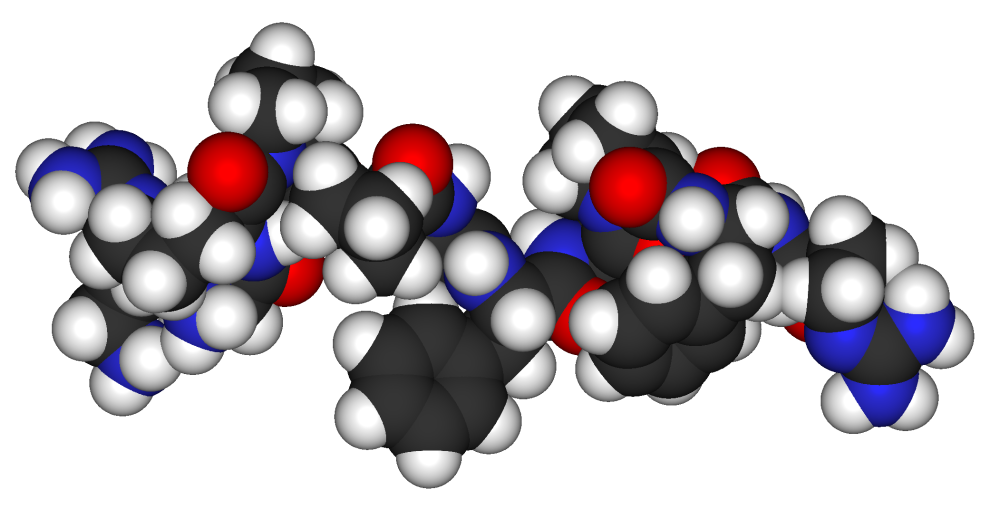

Names
- IUPAC name L-Lysyl-L-arginyl-L-prolyl-L-prolyl-glycyl-L-phenylalanyl-L-seryl-L-prolyl-L-phenylalanyl-L-arginine

Identifiers
CAS Number	342-10-9
3D model (JSmol)	Interactive image
ChEBI	CHEBI:6102
ChEMBL	ChEMBL5665421
ChemSpider	4470640
ECHA InfoCard	100.005.853
IUPHAR/BPS	650
KEGG	C01505
MeSH	Kallidin
PubChem CID	5311111
UNII	0T8T4A440G
CompTox Dashboard (EPA)	DTXSID40895018
- InChI: InChI=1S/C56H85N17O12/c57-24-8-7-18-36(58)46(76)67-37(19-9-25-63-55(59)60)51(81)73-29-13-23-44(73)53(83)72-28-11-21-42(72)49(79)65-32-45(75)66-39(30-34-14-3-1-4-15-34)47(77)70-41(33-74)52(82)71-27-12-22-43(71)50(80)69-40(31-35-16-5-2-6-17-35)48(78)68-38(54(84)85)20-10-26-64-56(61)62/h1-6,14-17,36-44,74H,7-13,18-33,57-58H2,(H,65,79)(H,66,75)(H,67,76)(H,68,78)(H,69,80)(H,70,77)(H,84,85)(H4,59,60,63)(H4,61,62,64)/t36-,37-,38-,39-,40-,41-,42-,43-,44-/m0/s1 Key: FYSKZKQBTVLYEQ-FSLKYBNLSA-N; InChI=1/C56H85N17O12/c57-24-8-7-18-36(58)46(76)67-37(19-9-25-63-55(59)60)51(81)73-29-13-23-44(73)53(83)72-28-11-21-42(72)49(79)65-32-45(75)66-39(30-34-14-3-1-4-15-34)47(77)70-41(33-74)52(82)71-27-12-22-43(71)50(80)69-40(31-35-16-5-2-6-17-35)48(78)68-38(54(84)85)20-10-26-64-56(61)62/h1-6,14-17,36-44,74H,7-13,18-33,57-58H2,(H,65,79)(H,66,75)(H,67,76)(H,68,78)(H,69,80)(H,70,77)(H,84,85)(H4,59,60,63)(H4,61,62,64)/t36-,37-,38-,39-,40-,41-,42-,43-,44-/m0/s1 Key: FYSKZKQBTVLYEQ-FSLKYBNLBR
- SMILES: O=C(N[C@H](C(=O)N[C@H](C(=O)O)CCC/N=C(\N)N)Cc1ccccc1)[C@H]5N(C(=O)[C@@H](NC(=O)[C@@H](NC(=O)CNC(=O)[C@H]3N(C(=O)[C@H]2N(C(=O)[C@@H](NC(=O)[C@@H](N)CCCCN)CCC/N=C(\N)N)CCC2)CCC3)Cc4ccccc4)CO)CCC5

Properties
Chemical formula	C_{56}H_{85}N_{17}O_{12}
Molar mass	1188.403 g·mol^{−1}
- Except where otherwise noted, data are given for materials in their standard state (at 25 °C [77 °F], 100 kPa). verify (what is ?) Infobox references

Kallidin, also called Kallidin II or Lysyl-bradykinin, is a peptide hormone derived from the precursor protein Kininogen 1. Kallidin is part of the kinin family of peptide hormones. Kallidin is a decapeptide whose sequence is H-Lys-Arg-Pro-Pro-Gly-Phe-Ser-Pro-Phe-Arg-OH. Removal of the N-terminal lysine by Factor XII, or to a leser extent aminopeptidase yields the potently bioactive bradykinin molecule.

== Formation of Kinins ==
In the early 1940s, researcher Eugen Werle worked extensively with his colleague Fritz Fiedler to study enzymes like kallikrein and their biological activation and inhibition behavior at different pH. Their research defined the properties and chemical actions of kallikrein, an enzyme in the kinin-kallikrein system that is connected to the body's cardiovascular, renal and inflammatory systems.

Kallikreins is the enzyme that hydrolyzes the protein, kininogens, found in the plasma to release active kinins such as kallidin and bradykinin. Depending on the type of kallikrein, i.e. plasma kallikrein would release bradykinin and tissue kallikrein would release kallidin or Lys-bradykinin. The whole catalytic mechanism relies on the Ser-His protease motif and is the biochemical basis for the Kallikrein-Kinin System (KKS) proposed by E. Werle and F. Fiedler.

== Effects of Kinins and Its Role in Disease ==
Kallidin is a bioactive kinin peptide formed in response to injury from kininogen precursors through the action of kallikreins. Like all kinins, kallidin, the deca-peptide, plays an important role in several body pathologies. Kinins can regulate the blood pressure by increasing the level of vasopressor substances. They can also bind to the B_{1} and B_{2} cell surface receptors, which are G-protein coupled receptors. The mediation of the B_{1} receptors by des-Arg kinins as agonists can be expressed in several medical issues, such as cancer and trauma. By binding to the B_{2} receptors, kinins, endogenous agonists, can regulate the vasodilatation and bronchioconstriction.

Kinin such as kallidin plays an important role in diseases such as Type 2 Diabetes and Parkinson. One research suggested that kallidin may protect a diabetic heart and reduce its risk from ischemic injury, improve nitric oxide availability and improve microvascular perfusion. Tissue kallikrein expression is increased in patients with diabetes and this kallikrein enzyme is responsible for producing kallin within tissues. So, kallidin production is locally upregulated within tissues, especially the cardiac muscle, even though the circulating kallidin level in the bloodstream is normal. Hence, this localized kallidin presence may serve as a cardioprotective mechanism in diabetes and contribute to improved vasodilation and support the heart to adapt to chronic metabolic and oxidative stress. This localized effect may also explain the reason behind positive therapeutic outcome of ACE inhibitors and ARBs in diabetic patients as these medications prolong kinin activity.

While kallidin acts as a cardioprotective mechanism in individuals with cardiovascular diseases, in neurodegenerative diseases such as Parkinson, kallidin has a negative effect. Kallidin acts as an amplifier for neuroinflammation and oxidative stress in Parkinson's disease (PD) by activating B1R pathways that increase the rate of dopamine releasing neuron death through its metabolite des-Arg^{10}-kallidin (DAKD). When kallidin (i.e. a kinin peptide similar to bradykinin with an N-terminal lysine) loses its C-terminal arginine in an enzymatic reaction, it forms DAKD which is known to be a strong natural agonist of the B1 receptor (B1R). B1R is very rarely expressed in healthy tissues but is highly induced during inflammation, injury or neurodegeneration. Therefore, in PD, B1R expression is very high and this makes neurons highly sensitive to DAKD. A research found that DAKD causes strong oxidative stress, triggers increased secretion of inflammatory cytokines linked to neuron death and strongly suppresses the dopamine receptor D2 (D2R) which in turn inhibits dopamine release and neuron cell survival and signaling ability. All of these together directly worsens neuron survival and thus suggests that kallidin-derived peptides accelerate neuron apoptosis.

== Chemical Mechanisms ==
Since kinins are peptides, they can be cleaved by the peptidases. Peptidases such as the serine peptidases, carboxypeptidase N and carboxypeptidase M cleave kinins into des-Arg-bradykinin and Lys-des-Arg-bradykinin.

== Clarification ==
Kallidin is identical to bradykinin with an additional lysine residue added at the N-terminal end and signals through the bradykinin receptor.

Despite exhibiting similar functions and reactivities, kinins can be differentiated by combining an amino-terminal-directed radioimmunoassay with a carboxy-terminal-directed radioimmunoassay in combination with HPLC.

== See also ==
- Kinin
- Bradykinin
- Kallikrein
- Kininongen
