= Intracellular receptor =

Receptors located inside the cell

Intracellular receptors are globular protein receptors located inside the cell rather than on its cell membrane. The word intracellular means "within or inside a cell." Molecules that cross a cell membrane to bind with a receptor are generally nonpolar and may be relatively small. These molecules are also known as ligands, these trigger how genes are turned on or off which are essential for processes like growth metabolism etc. Hormones that use intracellular receptors include thyroid, aldosterone, and steroid hormones.

== Mechanism of Intracellular Receptors ==
The process starts when a signaling molecule like hormones and binds to a specific receptor.

1. Binding: the molecule(hormone) bind to the intracellular receptor which changes its shape (induced-fit mechanism) and activates it.
2. Activation: the intracellular receptor moves to the nucleus if it wasn’t already in the nucleus.
3. DNA binding: the activated intracellular receptor binds to a specific part of the DNA called a hormone response element (HRE).
4. Gene regulation: the intracellular receptor either turns on or turns off the target gene which affects the production of proteins that control bodily processes

== Examples ==
Examples are the class of nuclear receptors located in the cell nucleus and cytoplasm and the IP_{3} receptor located on the endoplasmic reticulum. The ligands that bind to them are usually intracellular second messengers like inositol trisphosphate (IP_{3}) and extracellular lipophilic hormones like steroid hormones. Some intracrine peptide hormones also have intracellular receptors.

== Importance of Intracellular Receptors ==
1. Growth and development: steroid hormones like testosterone and estrogen guide puberty and reproduction
2. Energy use: thyroid hormones regulate how the body uses energy which influences weight temperature and mood.
3. Stress Response: Cortisol, a stress hormone, binds to its receptor to help the body respond to challenges.
4. Immune System: Some intracellular receptors control inflammation and immune responses
5. See also
- Receptor
- Steroid hormone

== Challenges Faced by Intracellular Receptors ==
- Hormone Resistance: For example, in androgen insensitivity syndrome, the body can’t respond to testosterone.
- Cancer: Overactive estrogen receptors can drive the growth of certain breast cancers.
- Metabolic Disorders: Faulty thyroid hormone receptors can cause problems like weight gain, fatigue, and more

== Therapies That Target Intracellular Receptors ==
Many medicines work by targeting intracellular receptors. For example:

- Tamoxifen: A drug that blocks estrogen receptors to treat hormone-sensitive breast cancer.
- Corticosteroids: Synthetic versions of cortisol that reduce inflammation in conditions like asthma and arthritis.
- Thyroid Hormone Pills: Used to treat hypothyroidism when natural hormone levels are too low.
