= Autacoid =

Biological factors that act like hormones

Autacoids or autocoids are biological factors (molecules) which act like local hormones, have a brief duration, and act near their site of biosynthesis. The word autacoid comes from the Greek words "autos" (self) and "acos" (relief; i.e., drug). The meaning of the term autacoid is not static and has changed over time. Keppel Hesselink discusses in an article that autacoid was historically used adjacent to the terms ‘hormone’ and ‘chalone’. The meaning of the term autacoid transitioned to something more specific as the field of biomedical science developed. From approximately 1916-19609, the term referred to hormone-like substances which inhibit or stimulate activity. In modern usage, autocoid generally refers to locally produced substances that act near their site of formation and are generally metabolized locally.

Autacoids are biological factors that can be produced on demand and act locally. Lipid-derived autacoids have roles in inflammation, pain, neuroprotection, and tissue repair. Several families of lipid autacoids have been described, including endocannabinoids, lipoxins, resolvins, protectins, maresins, and N-acylethanolamides such as palmitoylethanolamide. Some of these molecules specialize in limiting or resolving inflammation.

Lipid autacoids have been studied in relation to chronic pain and nervous system injury. Palmitoylethanolamide is known to have a role in inflammatory and neuropathic pain conditions. Other lipid autacoids, such as resolvins and lipoxins, have a role in reducing inflammation-related signaling and tissue recovery. Many lipid autacoids with therapeutic purposes have short half-lives. This makes delivery difficult and reduces downstream prospects. This is still currently under study.

The effects of autacoids are primarily local, though large quantities can be produced and moved into circulation. Autacoids may thus have systemic effects by being transported via the circulation. These regulating molecules are also metabolized locally. In sum, these compounds typically are produced locally, act locally and are metabolized locally. Autacoids can have a variety of different biological actions, including modulating the activities of smooth muscles, glands, nerves, platelets and other tissues.

Some autacoids are chiefly characterized by the effect they have on specific tissues, such as smooth muscle. With respect to vascular smooth muscle, there exist both vasoconstrictor and vasodilator autacoids. Vasodilator autacoids are released during periods of exercise. Their main effect is seen in the skin, where they facilitate heat loss.

These are local hormones; they therefore have a paracrine effect. Some notable autacoids are: eicosanoids, angiotensin, neurotensin, NO (nitric oxide), kinins, histamine, serotonin, endothelins and palmitoylethanolamide.

In 2015, a more precise definition of autacoids was proposed: "An autacoid is a locally produced modulating factor, influencing locally the function of cells and/or tissues, which is produced on demand and which subsequently is metabolized in the same cells and/or tissues".
