= GNRH2 =

Protein-coding gene in the species Homo sapiens

GnRH2

Identifiers
- Aliases: GNRH2, Gonadotropin-releasing hormone II, GnRH-II, LH-RHII, gonadotropin releasing hormone 2
- External IDs: OMIM: 602352; GeneCards: GNRH2

Gene location (Human)
Chr.	Chromosome 20 (human)
Band	20p13	Start	3,043,622 bp
Band	20p13	End	3,045,747 bp
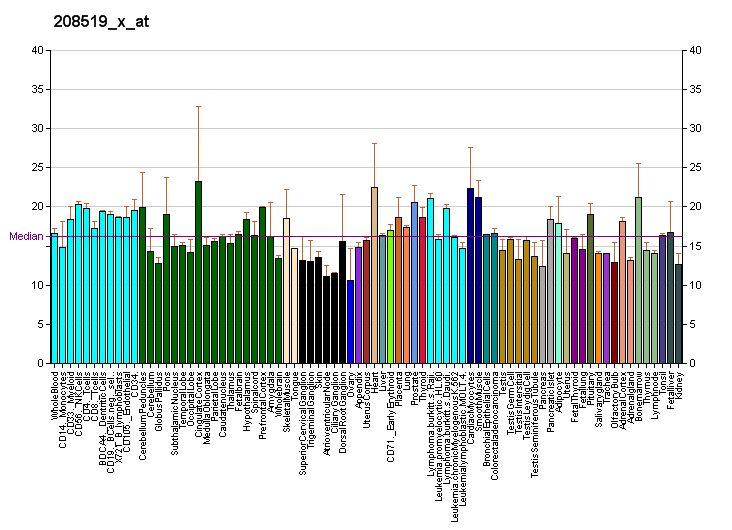
RNA expression pattern
Bgee	Human / Mouse (ortholog); Top expressed in: testicle; right lobe of liver; cerebellar hemisphere; right hemisphere of cerebellum; granulocyte; left ovary; right ovary; gastric mucosa; right coronary artery; right testis / n/a; More reference expression data
BioGPS	More reference expression data
Gene ontology
Molecular function	hormone activity; gonadotropin hormone-releasing hormone activity; gonadotropin-releasing hormone receptor binding
Cellular component	extracellular region; extracellular space
Biological process	multicellular organism development; signal transduction; regulation of signaling receptor activity; G protein-coupled receptor signaling pathway; reproduction
Sources:Amigo / QuickGO
Orthologs
Databases	NCBI: entry; OMA: entry
Species	Human	Mouse
Entrez	2797	n/a
Ensembl	ENSG00000125787	n/a
UniProt	O43555	n/a
RefSeq (mRNA)	NM_001310220; NM_001501; NM_178331; NM_178332	n/a
RefSeq (protein)	NP_001297149; NP_001492; NP_847901; NP_847902	n/a
Location (UCSC)	Chr 20: 3.04 – 3.05 Mb	n/a
PubMed search		n/a
- Wikidata
View/Edit Human

Progonadoliberin-2 is a protein that in humans is encoded by the GNRH2 gene.

The protein encoded by this gene is a preproprotein that is cleaved to form a secreted 10 aa peptide hormone, QHWSHGWYPG. The secreted decapeptide regulates reproduction in females by stimulating the secretion of both luteinizing- and follicle-stimulating hormones. Three transcript variants that encode unique proproteins but the same peptide hormone have been found for this gene. The peptide belongs to gonadotropin-releasing hormone family.

Most vertebrate species possess two or three forms of gonadotropin-releasing hormone (GnRH) expressed in three distinct brain regions. Although the function of the hypothalamic form (GnRH1; common to many vertebrates), in controlling the reproductive axis has been defined, the functions of the other two isoforms (GnRH2 and GnRH3) remain largely unknown. The presence and conservation of GnRH2 across vertebrate species indicate important biological roles, but the absence of GnRH2 in rodents has greatly hampered the use of these vertebrate models and modern molecular tools to pursue its functions.

A relatively well-documented function of GnRH2 is that the administration of GnRH2 has anorexigenic effects in female musk shrew, mouse, goldfish and zebrafish, but the mechanisms are still unclear.
