= Kinin (disambiguation) =

Kinin may refer to

- Kinin (protein)
- Kinin–kallikrein system, a hormonal system
