= Gonadotropin-releasing hormone family =

Family of peptides important in reproduction

Gonadotropin-releasing hormone

Identifiers
- Symbol: GnRH
- Pfam: PF00446
- InterPro: IPR002012
- PROSITE: PDOC00432
Available protein structures:
- PDB: IPR002012 PF00446 (ECOD; PDBsum)
- AlphaFold: IPR002012; PF00446

The gonadotropin-releasing hormones (GnRH) (gonadoliberin) are a family of peptides that play a pivotal role in reproduction. The main function of GnRH is to act on the pituitary to stimulate the synthesis and secretion of luteinizing and follicle-stimulating hormones, but GnRH also acts on the brain, retina, sympathetic nervous system, gonads, and placenta in certain species. There seems to be at least three forms of GnRH. The second form is expressed in midbrain and seems to be widespread. The third form has been found so far only in fish. GnRH is a C-terminal amidated decapeptide processed from a larger precursor protein. Four of the ten residues are perfectly conserved in all species where GnRH has been sequenced.

== Subfamilies ==
- Gonadoliberin I InterPro: IPR004079

== Human proteins containing this domain ==
GNRH1, GNRH2
