= Local hormone =

Local hormones are a large group of signaling molecules that do not circulate within the blood. Local hormones are produced by nerve and gland cells and bind to either neighboring cells or the same type of cell that produced them. Local hormones are activated and inactivated quickly. They are released during physical work and exercise. They mainly control smooth and vascular muscle dilation. Strength of response is dependent upon the concentration of receptors of target cell and the amount of ligand (the specific local hormone).

Eicosanoids (ī′kō-să-noydz; eicosa = twenty, eidos = formed) are a primary type of local hormone. These local hormones are polyunsaturated fatty acid derivatives containing 20 carbon atoms and fatty acids derived from phospholipids in the cell membrane or from diet. Eicosanoids initiate either autocrine stimulation or paracrine stimulation. There are two main types of eicosanoids: prostaglandins and leukotrienes, which initiate either autocrine stimulation or paracrine stimulation. Eicosanoids are the result of a ubiquitous pathway which first produces arachidonic acid, and then the eicosanoid product.

Prostaglandins are the most diverse category of eicosanoids and are thought to be synthesized in most tissues of the body. This type of local hormone stimulates pain receptors and increases the inflammatory response. Nonsteroidal anti-inflammatory drugs stop the formation of prostaglandins, thus inhibiting these responses.

Leukotrienes are a type of eicosanoids that are produced in leukocytes and function in inflammatory mediation.

Paracrines (para- = beside or near) are local hormones that act on neighboring cells. This type of signaling involves the secretion of paracrine factors, which travel a short distance in the extracellular environment to affect nearby cells. These factors can be excitatory or inhibitory. There are a few families of factors that are very important in embryo development including fibroblast growth factor secreted them.

Juxtacrines (juxta = near) are local hormones that require close contact and act on either the cell which emitted them or on adjacent cells.

== Classification ==
According to structural and functional similarity, many local hormones fall into either the gastrin or the secretin family.

== Gastrin family ==
The Gastrin family is a group of peptides evolutionarily similar in structure and function. Commonly synthesized in antroduodenal G-cells. Regulate gastric function along with gastric acid secretion and mucosal growth.

1. Gastrin
2. Cholecystokinin (CCK)

== Secretin family ==
The Secretin family are peptides that act as local hormones which regulate activity of G-protein coupled receptors. Most often found in the pancreas and the intestines. Secretin was discovered in 1902 by E. H. Starling. It was later linked to chemical regulation and was the first substance to be deemed a hormone.

1. Secretin
2. Glucagon
3. Glicentin (GLI)
4. Vasoactive intestinal peptide (VIP)
5. Gastric inhibitory polypeptide (GIP)

== Others ==
1. Motilin
2. Neurotensin
3. Substance P
4. Somatostatin
5. Bombesin
6. Serotonin
7. Angiotensin
8. Nitric Oxide
9. Kinins
10. Histamine
