= Neohormone =

Group of hormones associated with the success of mammalian development

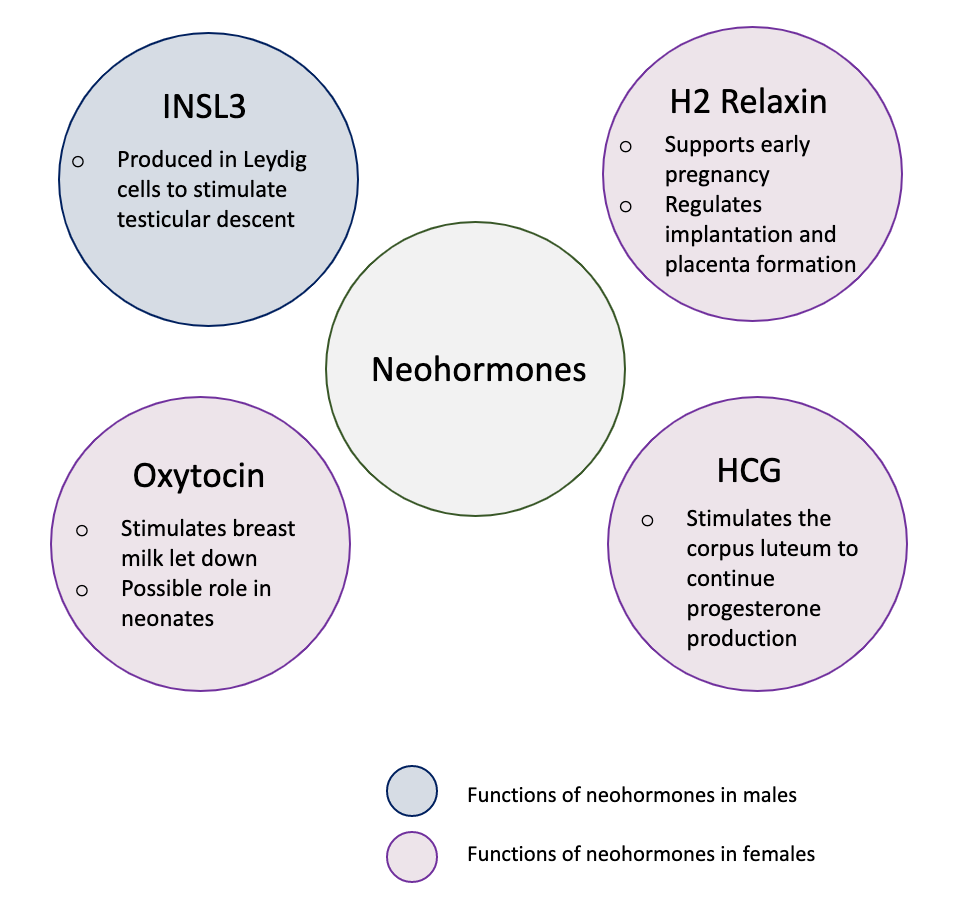
Key functions of neohormones

Neohormones are a group of recently evolved hormones primarily associated to the success of mammalian development. These hormones are specific to mammals and are not found in other vertebrates—this is because neohormones are evolved to enhance specific mammalian functions. In males, neohormones play important roles in regulating testicular descent (the testes descend into the scrotum during foetal development) and preparing the sperm for internal fertilisation (the sperm fertilizes the egg within the female). In females, neohormones are essential for regulating early pregnancy, mammary gland development lactation (secretion of milk from the mammary gland), and viviparity (allowing the fertilized egg to grow inside the female until they can exist independently). Neohormones superimpose their actions on the hypothalamic-pituitary-gonadal axis (a hormone system which regulates key reproductive functions in animals) and are not associated with other core bodily functions.

== Pre-natal functions of neohormones ==
Prenatally, neohormones play a role in the development of the embryo as well as supporting early pregnancy.

=== H2 Relaxin ===
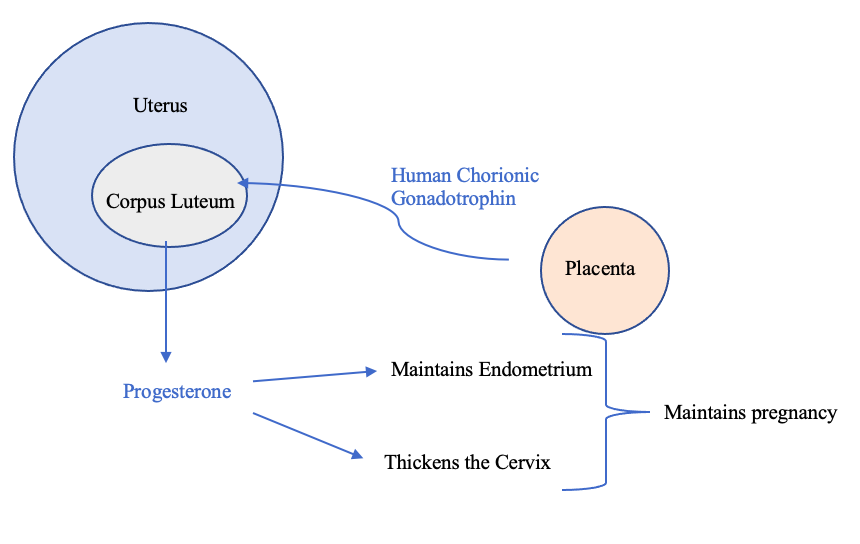
The effect of hCG in maintaining pregnancy

In the human ovary, H2 relaxin is produced by the corpus luteum and by Granulosa cells from large antral follicles. Research has shown that the relaxin gene is expressed once the Granulosa cells have reached a certain luteinised status, by which Granulosa cells differentiate into Luteal cells. Therefore, it can act as a good biomarker in relation to Granulosa cell differentiation status.

Relaxin is produced to support early pregnancy until the placenta can take over. Relaxin plays a key role in implantation and placenta formation.

The relaxin receptor RXFP1 is found on myometrial cells. In rats, it has been linked playing a role in the spacing between embryos in the uterus. RXFP1 is also located on endometrial stromal cells where it can induce cyclic adenosine monophosphate (cAMP). cAMP is a molecule which is necessary for the functional changes in the endometrium to form the decidual lining, where the blastocyst can implant. This results in neo-angiogenesis and endometrial thickening, both linked to early pregnancy development.

=== Human chorionic gonadotropin ===
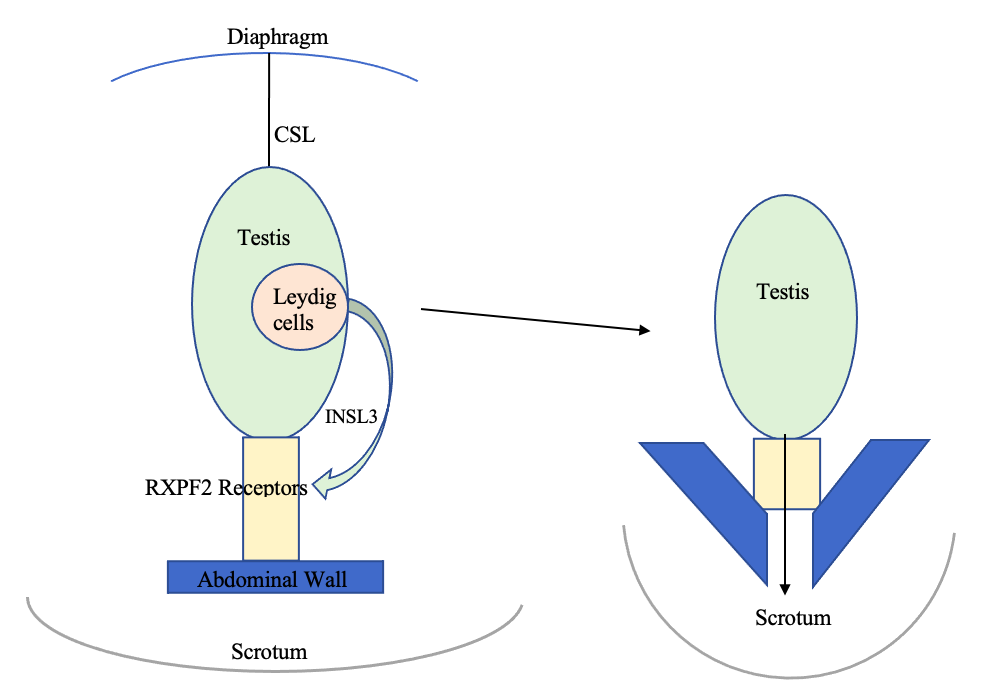
The role of INSL3 in testicular descent

Human chorionic gonadotropin (hCG) is a hormone produced by the placenta during pregnancy. This hormone stimulates the Corpus Luteum to produce progesterone to maintain pregnancy. Therefore, hCG plays a role in human maternal recognition of pregnancy.

=== Insulin-like peptide 3 ===
Insulin-Like Peptide 3 (INSL3) is produced by the interstitial Leydig cells located in the adult testes. Leydig cells are responsible for steroidogenesis, the fetal Leydig cells differentiate during the development of the embryo. They produce necessary androgens for the masculinisation of organs. They also produce INSL3, which is required for the first transabdominal phase of testicular descent. INSL3 acts on RXFP2 receptors which link the testis to the inguinal abdominal wall. As a result, the testes move from the inguinal canal into the scrotum. Only mammals have a scrotum and descended testes. INSL3 measured in amniotic fluid can therefore be a biomarker for testis development, although this period differs between species.

== Post-natal functions of neohormones ==
After birth, neohormones play a major role in development of mammary glands and their function. Alongside, neohormones have also been measured to be a significant component of breast milk. The so-called lactocrine hypothesis dictates that breast milk does not simply fulfil nutritional requirements but also plays an important role in signaling and development in the neonate. Neohormones are theorised to have specific effects on target organs in the neonate, but more research is needed in this area, and effects have been observed to different extents in different species.

=== Oxytocin ===
Oxytocin is responsible for the milk let-down reflex as a response to neonate suckling. It is released from the posterior pituitary gland in a pulsatile manner, via stimulation of the vagus nerve. This causes myoepithelial cells, which surround the mammary alveoli, to contract. Oxytocin injections have been found to increase milk yield in cows. The role of oxytocin in the neonate is yet quite unclear, however we know that oxytocin has an important role in empathy and bonding between pairs.

=== Relaxin ===
There are three relaxin genes in humans. One type, H2, is made and secreted in the ovaries, as well as in the mammary glands. Relaxin acts via locally expressed specific receptors located on parenchyma and myoepithelial cells. It reaches peak concentrations 24-48 hours after birth and then declines.

=== Human Chorionic Gonadotropin ===
Like relaxin, hCG may be measured, although the effects on the neonate are not well understood. It is posited that it may act as an LH paralogue to affect the development of neonatal gonads, although further research is required.

== Biomarkers of reproductive health ==
The main neohormones that can be used as biomarkers of reproductive health are relaxin, oxytocin, hCG, INSL3, and INSL5 and INSL6.

Relaxin (Specifically Ovarian H2-relaxin) aids in the implantation of the embryo into the uterine wall after fertilisation, as well as establishing the placenta. The levels of relaxin are altered in cases of early miscarriage and hence can be used as a biomarker during early pregnancy.

Oxytocin has a range of functions in the reproductive systems of both males and females. It has a major role in the production of breast milk and lactation. It is responsible for muscle contractions in the uterus to facilitate birth. It also assists in ovarian steroid production and ovum release. In men, oxytocin has a role in erections and ejaculation. It also participates in gonadal development in both males and females. Despite being tricky to measure, measuring oxytocin can help build a clinical picture of reproductive health in the above mechanisms.

hCG has a vital role in early pregnancy. Higher levels of hCG is a good indication for the survival and viability of the embryo. β-hCG can be monitored to test for an ectopic pregnancy.

INSL3 is responsible for the first phase of testicular descent in males and may be disrupted in cases of cryptorchidism. It also acts as a measure of Leydig cell function, particularly in older males.

INSL5 and INSL6 may have a role in spermatogenesis. There are currently no ways to measure these hormones but there is some evidence that with altered INSL5, there is reduced fertility and impaired spermatogenesis.

== Therapeutic uses of neohormones ==
Relaxin has been shown to repair and reverse the symptoms associated with scleroderma (an autoimmune condition affecting connective tissues, blood vessels and internal organs) and fibrosis (thickening, hardening or build up of scar tissue). It also aids in the formation of new blood vessels (angiogenesis). This is also beneficial in wound management and healing. Other potential targets include the use of relaxin within human reproduction, such as in the preparation of the cervix for labour and birth and also as a drug target for breast cancer treatment although much more research is required in this area.

Oxytocin is important for many different biological processes including social, maternal and sexual behaviours, pregnancy, milk production, and ejaculation. Agonists and antagonists of oxytocin – development of drugs that can utilise the receptor binding activity of oxytocin is an important therapeutic target as this could be applied to a range of conditions. Oxytocin plays a role in cell proliferation and differentiation in different ways depending on where it is in the body. Understanding the underlying pathways for different localities could help with development of cancer therapies.
