= Gastrin family =

Gastrin/cholecystokinin family

Identifiers
- Symbol: Gastrin
- Pfam: PF00918
- InterPro: IPR001651
- PROSITE: PDOC00232
Available protein structures:
- PDB: IPR001651 PF00918 (ECOD; PDBsum)
- AlphaFold: IPR001651; PF00918

The gastrin family (also known as the gastrin/cholecystokinin family) of proteins is defined by the peptide hormones gastrin and cholecystokinin. Gastrin and cholecystokinin (CCK) are structurally and functionally related peptide hormones that serve as regulators of various digestive processes and feeding behaviors. Additional structurally related members of this family include the amphibian caerulein skin peptide, the cockroach leukosulphakinin I and II (LSK) peptides, Drosophila melanogaster putative CCK-homologs Drosulphakinins I and II, cionin, a chicken gastrin/cholecystokinin-like peptide and cionin, a neuropeptide from the protochordate Ciona intestinalis.

Gastrin and CCK are important hormonal regulators that are known to induce gastric secretion, stimulate pancreatic secretion, increase blood circulation and water secretion in the stomach and intestine, and stimulate smooth muscle contraction. Originally found in the gut, these hormones have since been shown to be present in various parts of the nervous system.

Like many other active peptides they are synthesized as larger protein precursors that are then enzymatically converted into their mature forms. They exist in several molecular forms due to tissue-specific post-translational processing.

The biological activity of gastrin and CCK is associated with the last five C-terminal residues. One or two positions upstream, there is a conserved sulphated tyrosine residue.

== Human proteins from this family ==
- CCK
- GAST
