= Kinin =

Group of peptides

A kinin is any of various structurally related peptides, such as bradykinin and kallidin. They are members of the autacoid family. Kinins are peptides that are cleaved from kininogens by the process of kallikreins. Kallikreins activate kinins when stimulated.

It is a component of the kinin-kallikrein system.

Their precursors are kininogens. Kininogens contain a 9-11 amino acid bradykinin sequence.

In botany, the plant hormones known as cytokinins were first called kinins; the name was changed to avoid confusion.

== Effects of kinins ==
Kinins are short-lived peptides that cause pain sensation, arteriolar dilation, increase vascular permeability, and cause contractions in smooth muscle. Kinins transmit their effects through G protein-coupled receptors.

Kinins act on axons to block nerve impulses, which leads to distal muscle relaxation. They are also potent nerve stimulators which are mostly responsible for the pain sensation (and sometimes itching). Kinins increase vascular permeability by acting on vascular endothelial cells to cause cell contraction. Concomitantly, they induce local expression of adhesive molecules. Together they increase white blood cell adhesion and extravasation. Kinins are rapidly inactivated by the proteases generated locally during the aforementioned processes.

They act locally to induce vasodilation and contraction of smooth muscle. Kinins function as mediators for inflammatory responses by triggering the immune system. They are also able to regulate cardiovascular and renal (kidney) function by mediating the effects of ACE inhibitors. Reduced kinin activity can result in high blood pressure, sodium retention, and the narrowing of blood vessels.

Aspirin inhibits the activation of kallenogen by interfering with the formation of the kallikrein enzyme, which is essential in the process of activation.

== Where kinins are produced ==
Kinins are mostly produced at inflamed or injured tissues of the body and human body fluids. Kinin peptides (kallidin and bradykinin) are located in human blood and urine.

== Kinin receptors ==
There are two types of kinin receptors: B1 and B2. Both are G-protein coupled receptors in which B2 are expressed in various tissues and B1 are induced from inflammation, tissue injuries, and stress. The human body contains more B2 receptors than B1 receptors.

B1 and B2 receptors are essentially related as homologous genes. Both have the same cellular signaling pathways, although their patterns are different in intensity and duration; the B1 signaling pathway lasts longer than the B2 signaling pathway.

== History ==
Kinin was initially discovered by J.E. Abelous and E. Bardier in 1909 while performing experiments where human body fluids, such as urine, were injected into dogs. The resulting observations state that the urine caused a reduction in blood pressure.
