= CLE peptide =

Group of peptides found in plants

CLE peptides (CLAVATA3/Embryo Surrounding Region-Related) are a group of peptides found in plants that are involved with cell signaling. Production is controlled by the CLE genes. Upon binding to a CLE peptide receptor in another cell, a chain reaction of events occurs, which can lead to various physiological and developmental processes. This signaling pathway is conserved in diverse land plants.

== Background ==
Plants and animals alike both use small polypeptides for signaling in cell-to-cell communication. CLAVATA3/Embryo Surrounding Region-Related, also known as a plant peptide hormone, signaling is important for cell to cell signaling but also long distance communication. These two actions are especially important for plant cells because they are stationary and must perform cell expansion. In multicellular organisms, cell-to-cell communication has been found to be very crucial for many growth processes that occur inside the organism. The 12 or 13 amino acid polypeptides are the mature forms of the CLE proteins that are derived from the conserved CLE domains. More and more CLE genes are being identified with more research being conducted in this area. CLE genes have not only been found in seed plants but also in lycophytes, bryophytes, and green algae.

== Genes ==
Most research that has been conducted on CLE peptide signaling has been conducted with Arabidopsis, since this genome contains 32 members of the CLE gene family. CLV3, which belongs to the CLE family of genes, is found within one or more tissues of Arabidopsis. All 32 members of the CLE family share two characteristics that include: encoding of a small protein with a putative secretion signal at their N- termini and contain a conserved CLE motif at or near their C-termini. The 32 members of the CLE gene family originated from mutations of the original gene.

== Structures ==
CLE peptides are coded by the CLE genes. These peptides vary in structure, with each peptide structure performing a different job within the plant. The minimal length of functioning CLE peptides has been found to be 12 amino acids with several critical residues. There are two different peptide structures that are found within the plant and they are A-type and B-type. When A-type hormones are secreted the plant slows down the rate of root growth whereas the secretion of B-type peptides effects the vascular growth of the plant. The secretion of A-type peptides speeds up the vascular development of the plant that is mediated by the B-type peptides. This suggests that these two types of peptides work together to regulate the growth of the plant. The specific peptides are:

A-type peptides

- CLE 1/3/4
- CLE 2
- CLE 5/6
- CLE 7
- CLE 8
- CLE 9
- CLE 10
- CLE 11
- CLE 12
- CLE 13
- CLE 14
- CLE 16
- CLE 17
- CLE 18
- CLE 19
- CLE 20
- CLE 21
- CLE 22
- CLE 25
- CLE 26
- CLE 27
- CLE 40
- CLE 45

B-type peptides

- CLE 41/44/TDIF
- CLE 42
- CLE 43
- CLE 46

== Signaling in the shoot apical meristem ==
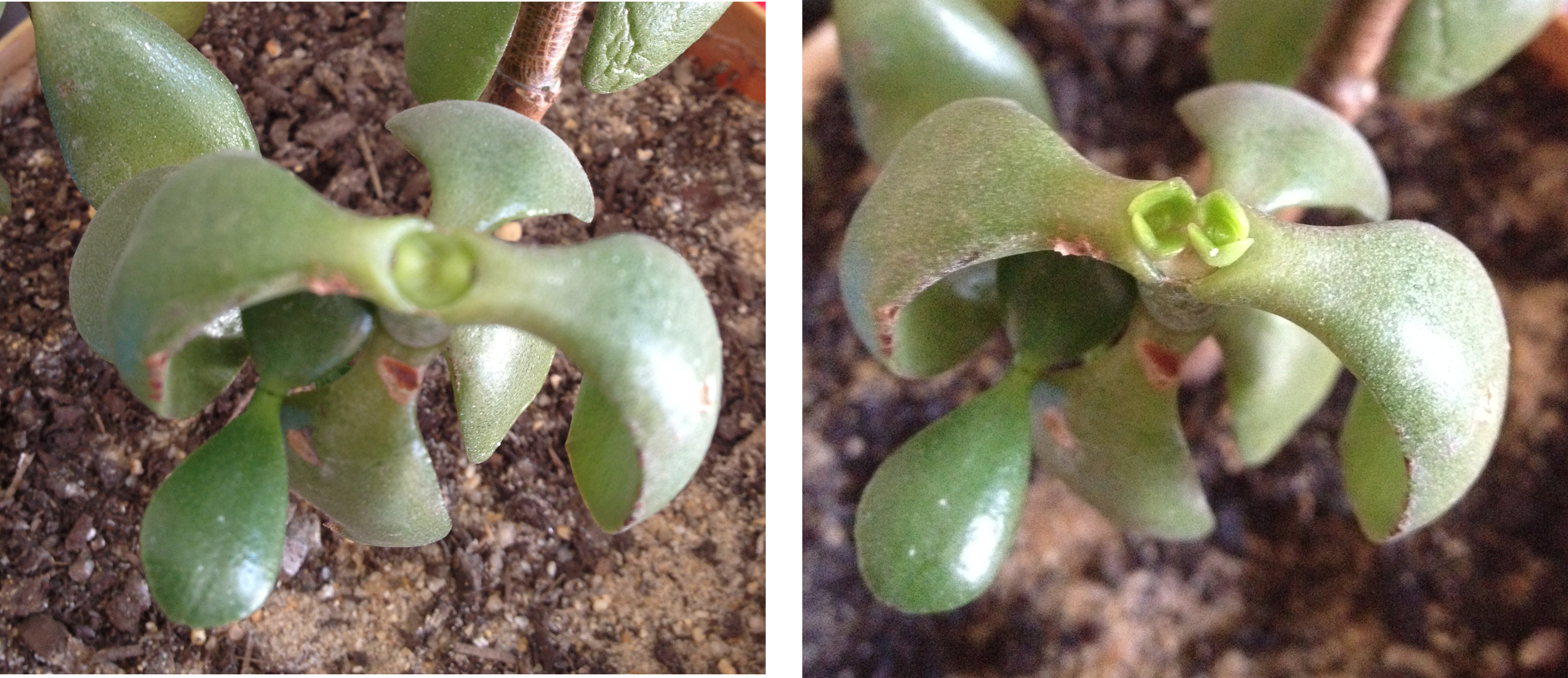
Shoot apical meristems of Crassula ovata (left). Fourteen days later, leaves have developed (right).

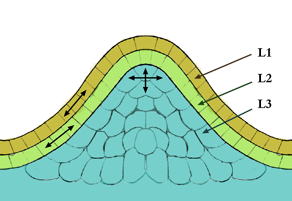
Tunica-Corpus model of the apical meristem (growing tip). The epidermal (L1) and subepidermal (L2) layers form the outer layers called the tunica. The inner L3 layer is called the corpus. Cells in the L1 and L2 layers divide in a sideways fashion, which keeps these layers distinct, whereas the L3 layer divides in a more random fashion.

Meristematic cells give rise to various organs of the plant and keep the plant growing. There are two types of meristematic tissues 1) Apical Meristem 2) Lateral Meristem. The Apical Meristem is of two types; the shoot apical meristem (SAM) gives rise to organs like the leaves and flowers, while the root apical meristem (RAM) provides the meristematic cells for the future root growth. SAM and RAM cells divide rapidly and are considered indeterminate, in that they do not possess any defined end status. In that sense, meristematic cells are frequently compared to animal stem cells, which have an analogous behavior and function. Within plants, SAM cells play a major role in the overall growth and development, this is due to the fact that all cells making up the major parts of the plant come from the shoot apical meristem (SAM). There are three different important areas found within the SAM and they include the central zone, the peripheral zone, and the rib meristem. Each of these areas play an important role in the production of new stem cells within the SAM. All SAMs are usually dome shaped and have structures that are layered and are described as the tunica and corpus. CLV3 plays an important role in regulating the production of stem cells within the Central Zone region of the (SAM), this is also true for the cell promoting WUSCHEL (WUS) gene. The combination of these two genes regulates stem cell production by WUS negatively or positively regulating the production of stem cells by controlling the CLV3 gene.

=== Genes in other plants ===
CLE genes have been found in numerous monocots, dicots, and even moss. Research has even shown that some plants, like rice, contain the presence of a multi-CLE domain. Various CLE-like genes have also been found in the genomes of plant-parasitic nematodes such as beet, soybean and potato cyst nematodes.
