= Prohormone =

Precursor of a hormone

A prohormone is a committed precursor of a hormone consisting of peptide hormones synthesized together that has a minimal hormonal effect by itself because of its expression-suppressing structure, often created by protein folding and binding additional peptide chains to certain ends, that makes hormone receptor binding sites located on its peptide hormone chain segments inaccessible.

Prohormones can travel the blood stream as a hormone in an inactivated form, ready to be activated later in the cell by post-translational modification.

The body naturally produces prohormones as a way to regulate hormone expression, making them an optimal storage and transportation unit for inactive hormones. Once prohormones are needed to be expressed, prohormone convertase, a protein, cleaves the prohormones and separates them into one or more active hormones. Often in nature, this cleaving process happens immediately, and a prohormone is quickly converted to a set of one or more peptide hormones.

Examples of natural, human prohormones include proinsulin and pro-opiomelanocortin, but the most widespread prohormones in use are synthetic and labeled as anabolic steroid precursors, used as ergogenic or anabolic agents for muscle growth. A commonly consumed example of said precursors are androstenedione and androstenediol, both of which are currently banned substances in the United States. However, several illegal steroids, such as 1-testosterone, are still being produced legally under different chemical names, and the majority have not undergone clinical studies.

== Structure ==
Prohormones vary considerably in length and design, as do peptide hormones, but their base structure is the same. They consist of one or more inactive peptide hormones or hormone chains attached to each other in a way that prevents hormone expression, often by making the chains' binding ends inaccessible via folding and binding of other chains to said ends. For hormonal expression to be induced, the binding ends of hormones but either bind to receptors in the cell membrane, or in the case of steroids, bind to steroid receptor proteins in the cell, both of which mediate hormone expression.

Proinsulin molecule; schematic, topological drawing. B chain (orange), C-peptide (gray), and A chain (green). The C-peptide is seen to bind to the B and A chains and suppress hormonal expression. When cleavage occurs to produce insulin, the B and A chain are connected by disulfide bonds, while the C-peptide is cut out and discarded.

Some prohormones contain structures other than inactive peptide hormones for the purpose of keeping hormone expression suppressed. For example, proinsulin contains an extra non-hormonal chain called C-peptide that binds two insulin peptide chains together, designed to keep both chains inactive by binding to their ends, specifically, their C-domain junctions, which have been proposed to be their site of binding to hormone-expression receptors in the cell. Despite the restrictions it enables, the C-peptide folds the proinsulin chains to make their junction ends accessible to be cleaved by prohormone convertases later, making the folding of the proinsulin chain containing C-peptide essential for the proper cleavage of proinsulin to successfully produce insulin.

== Function ==
Prohormones allow for transport and storage of usually-active proteins as inactive peptide chains, though they are much more commonly found in nature as a stable intermediate in the protein-synthesizing process of the cell. Proinsulin, for example, is seen in nature as a brief precursor to insulin, as it is produced on the ribosomes of the cell, transported to the Golgi apparatus as proinsulin, then is converted to insulin immediately after reaching the Golgi apparatus. It is also primarily stored as insulin.

However, other inactive proteins travel in their prohormone form, such as vitamin D, also known as calciferol, which can be produced by the human body via sunlight.

The main regulator of prohormone to hormone conversion is prohormone convertase. Located in the Golgi apparatus, it uses endoproteolytic cleavage to separate peptide hormones from each other and removes extended amino acid residues that hinder the inactive peptides from being active proteins. Because of this role, prohormone convertase is one of the deciding factors for regulation of hormone content in the body, as it has the ability to change an inactive protein with unsubstantial hormonal effect on the body, to a fully active protein with a meaningful hormonal effect.

For peptide hormones, the conversion process from prohormone to hormone (pro-protein to protein) typically occurs after being exported to the endoplasmic reticulum and often requires multiple processing enzymes. Proamylin, which is cosecreted with proinsulin, requires the above three factors and an amidating monooxygenase to convert itself to an active hormone. Some pro-protein precursors, such as preproinsulin, also go through this process, with the added step of removing a signal peptide by signal peptidases, to convert said precursors into prohormones.

== Uses ==
=== Prohormone supplements ===
The most everyday use of prohormones is as supplements for muscle growth via ergogenic and anabolic agents. Prohormone supplements became popular from 1960 to 2001 and became used unregulated in Major League Baseball before select prohormones such as androstenedione and androstenediol became banned in the United States' Anabolic Steroid Control Act of 2004. Many prohormone supplements that were claimed to impart anabolic or ergogenic effects in men were banned for their poor side effects, commonly in supplements such as in 3β-hydroxy-5α-androst-1-en-17-one, commonly known as 1-testosterone, which are as follows:

- Acne
- Hair loss
- Increased risk of heart disease
- Kidney and liver dysfunction
- Hypertension
- Impotence

Many prohormone supplements such as 1-testosterone were legal in the United States until reclassified as a Schedule III drug in 2005. However, many illegal prohormones like 1-testosterone are currently being sold legally and marketed by brands such as "Advanced Muscle Science" as 1-androsterone, and are labeled to contain 1-androstenedione-3b-ol,17-one. Only through a recent clinical study has it been shown that the 1-androsterone in the capsules being sold was identified using semi-quantitation and confirmed to be 1-testosterone.

Research surrounding other prohormones and prohormone supplements is limited, so many side effects are unknown regarding both legal and illegal prohormone supplements.

== See also ==
- Androgen prohormone
- Prehormone
- Preprohormone
- Prodrug
- Protein precursor
