= Intracrine signaling =

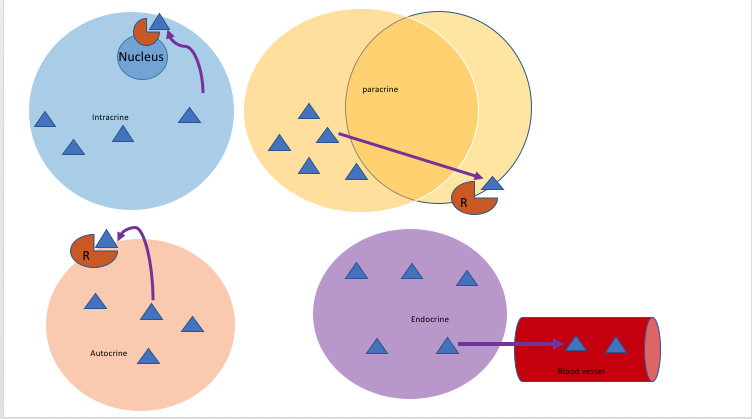
Illustrations of intracrine, paracrine, autocrine and endocrine

Intracrine signaling is a mode of hormone and growth factor action in which signaling molecules exert their effects within the same cell that produces them, without being secreted into the extracellular environment. The term intracrine was originally coined to describe peptides that either act within the cell that synthesized them or function after being internalized by their target cells. While this model was initially developed through studies on the intracellular action of angiotensin II, it has since been recognized as a fundamental mechanism applicable to numerous peptide hormones and growth factors.

Unlike classical endocrine, autocrine, and paracrine signaling, where signaling molecules leave the cell and interact with membrane-bound receptors, intracrine signaling functions exclusively within the intracellular environment, often targeting nuclear or cytoplasmic receptors. This mechanism allows cells to autonomously regulate essential biological functions, including gene expression, differentiation, and survival. One of the most well-characterized examples of intracrine signaling is the local synthesis and action of sex steroids within immune cells, which modulate inflammatory responses and metabolic pathways.

The intracrine hypothesis has been instrumental in predicting novel functions for peptide hormones and has generated significant insights with potential therapeutic implications. Since its initial proposal, an expanding body of observational evidence—independent of the hypothesis itself—has reinforced the role of intracrine signaling in various physiological and pathological processes, including immune regulation, metabolic control, and cancer progression.

== The use of "Intracrine" ==
As described above, intracrine signaling, also called intracrine action, is a process in which a cell produces a hormone that acts within the same cell that synthesized it. However, the term "intracrines" can be used more broadly to refer to all hormones that act on receptors within the cell, regardless of whether they act on their cell of origin.

This means that while some intracrines function in a strictly intracrine manner, others may be secreted to influence neighboring cells. In such cases, an intracrine can function in a paracrine manner while still exerting its effects within the original cell through intracellular signaling.

== A conceptual shift to intracrinology from endocrinology ==
The field of intracrinology was introduced about 40 years ago and is only now gaining widespread recognition. This shift has been driven by overwhelming evidence that many cells, beyond the traditionally recognized endocrine organs, can synthesize, metabolize, and regulate their own sex hormones. This paradigm challenges the traditional endocrine model, which held that sex steroid production and regulation occur primarily in the gonads.

Intracrinology has transformed our understanding of tissue autonomy, emphasizing how local hormone production enables precise, cell-specific regulation of physiological processes. This perspective has had profound implications for rheumatology, oncology, and metabolic research, where local steroidogenesis influences disease progression and treatment responses.

== Positive feedback loops ==
For many intracrines, once they stimulate the upregulation of a gene, a positive feedback loop is initiated. The intracrine promotes cell proliferation and stimulates further intracellular signaling, leading to increased synthesis and release of the intracrine itself, thereby reinforcing the loop. In multicellular organisms, an intracrine may also be secreted, causing neighboring cells to proliferate and enter a similar positive feedback loop. This mechanism results in a coordinated response that contributes to tissue growth and development.

== Intracrinology in the cardiovascular system ==
=== Angiotensin II ===
Angiotensin II is a key component of the renin-angiotensin system and is traditionally recognized for its role as an extracellular hormone regulating blood pressure, fluid balance, and vascular function. However, emerging evidence suggests that Ang II also functions as an intracrine factor within cardiac myocytes and vascular smooth muscle cells. This intracrine role of Ang II contributes to cardiac hypertrophy, fibrosis, and arrhythmogenesis, making it a critical regulator of cardiovascular physiology and pathology.

==== Intracrine localization and mechanisms ====
Image of a Mitochondria

Intracellular Ang II is generated within cardiac cells either through internalization of circulating Ang II or by intracellular synthesis via non-secreted renin and angiotensinogen. Unlike its extracellular counterpart, intracrine Ang II does not rely on traditional cell surface receptors; instead, it binds to nuclear AT1 receptors, modulating gene transcription and intracellular signaling pathways.

Studies have demonstrated that intracrine Ang II localizes to the nucleus and mitochondria of cardiac myocytes, where it influences cellular metabolism, oxidative stress, and calcium homeostasis. Additionally, intracellular Ang II has been shown to enhance the transcription of genes involved in hypertrophy and fibrosis, contributing to pathological cardiac remodeling.

==== Role in cardiac hypertrophy and fibrosis ====
Intracrine Ang II has been implicated in the development of cardiac hypertrophy, a process characterized by the enlargement of cardiac myocytes in response to increased workload or stress. Experimental models have shown that overexpression of non-secreted Ang II in cardiac cells leads to rapid hypertrophy independent of extracellular Ang II signaling. This suggests that intracellular Ang II plays a direct role in cardiomyocyte growth and structural remodeling.

Similarly, intracrine Ang II contributes to myocardial fibrosis by upregulating profibrotic cytokines and growth factors, such as transforming growth factor-beta (TGF-β) and platelet-derived growth factor (PDGF). This promotes the excessive deposition of extracellular matrix proteins, leading to stiffening of the cardiac tissue and impaired cardiac function.

==== Influence on electrical conductivity and arrhythmogenesis ====
Vertebrate gap junction

Beyond its structural effects, intracrine Ang II has been shown to alter cardiac electrical conductivity, increasing the risk of arrhythmias. Intracellular dialysis of Ang II in cardiomyocytes has been observed to reduce junctional conductance and alter calcium signaling, which may contribute to the development of atrial fibrillation and other arrhythmias in conditions such as heart failure.

Additionally, the ability of intracrine Ang II to modulate gap junctions and ion channels highlights its potential role in electrical remodeling of the heart. This mechanism may underlie the persistent electrical abnormalities seen in pathological cardiac conditions.

=== Parathyroid hormone-related protein ===
Parathyroid hormone-related protein (PTHrP) is a multifunctional peptide that plays a crucial role in calcium homeostasis, vascular regulation, and cellular proliferation. While it is traditionally recognized as a secreted factor that binds to surface receptors, PTHrP also functions as an intracrine regulator within cardiac cells. Its intracrine actions influence myocardial growth, vascular remodeling, and responses to stress, making it a key factor in cardiovascular physiology and pathology.

==== Intracrine actions of PTHrP in cardiac cells ====
PTHrP exists in multiple isoforms, with some retained intracellularly rather than secreted. In cardiac myocytes and vascular smooth muscle cells, intracrine PTHrP is known to localize within the nucleus, where it regulates gene transcription, modulates cell proliferation, and affects intracellular calcium handling.

One of the hallmark intracrine functions of PTHrP is its ability to influence angiogenesis. Studies have shown that nuclear PTHrP interacts with ribosomal DNA to upregulate genes involved in endothelial cell proliferation and vascular development. This action mirrors other intracrine factors, such as VEGF, which also regulate angiogenesis through nuclear localization.

==== Role in myocardial growth and adaptation ====
Intracrine PTHrP has been implicated in myocardial development and adaptation to stress. It is particularly active during embryonic heart development, where it influences cardiomyocyte differentiation and growth. Additionally, under conditions of cardiac stress, such as ischemia or hypertrophy, PTHrP expression is upregulated, suggesting a protective role in maintaining myocardial function.

Moreover, in vascular smooth muscle cells, intracrine PTHrP plays a dual role. While secreted PTHrP can inhibit cell proliferation via receptor-mediated pathways, intracellular PTHrP exerts a mitogenic effect, promoting vascular remodeling and adaptation in response to hemodynamic changes.

==== Implications for cardiovascular disease and therapeutics ====
The dual extracellular and intracellular actions of PTHrP make it a promising target for cardiovascular therapies. Given its role in regulating cardiac cell growth and vascular integrity, modulating PTHrP expression or its intracellular signaling pathways could be beneficial in conditions such as heart failure, atherosclerosis, and ischemic heart disease. Additionally, therapeutic strategies that enhance intracrine PTHrP activity could improve angiogenesis and myocardial repair following injury.

In conclusion, PTHrP is a key intracrine regulator in the cardiovascular system, influencing both myocardial and vascular function. Its ability to act within the nucleus and cytoplasm of cardiac cells highlights its potential as a therapeutic target for cardiovascular diseases. Future research focusing on the intracrine mechanisms of PTHrP may provide novel insights into cardiac regeneration and vascular remodeling.

=== Vascular endothelial growth factor ===
Vascular endothelial growth factor (VEGF) is widely recognized for its role in angiogenesis and vascular homeostasis. However, beyond its classical extracellular signaling functions, VEGF also exerts intracellular, or intracrine, effects, particularly in cardiac tissues. Intracrine VEGF plays a significant role in cardiac development, angiogenesis, and the adaptive response to ischemic injury.

==== Intracrine function of VEGF in cardiac cells ====
VEGF has been identified as an intracrine factor, meaning that it not only acts through autocrine and paracrine pathways but also functions within the cells that produce it. In cardiac myocytes and endothelial cells, VEGF can be synthesized and retained intracellularly, where it directly influences gene expression, protein synthesis, and cellular survival mechanisms. Unlike its secreted counterpart, intracrine VEGF operates independently of cell-surface receptors, exerting effects within the nucleus and cytoplasm.

Studies suggest that intracrine VEGF contributes to cellular differentiation during cardiac organogenesis. In embryonic and progenitor cardiac cells, VEGF facilitates the transcription of genes involved in cell survival, proliferation, and vascular patterning. Its presence in stem cell nuclei suggests that it may regulate ribosomal DNA transcription, similar to other intracrines, thereby coordinating cellular growth and differentiation.

==== Intracrine VEGF and cardiac protection ====
The intracrine actions of VEGF have been implicated in cardioprotection, particularly in response to ischemic stress. Cardiac myocytes exposed to hypoxic conditions exhibit increased intracellular VEGF, which appears to play a role in cellular adaptation to oxygen deprivation. This intracrine mechanism promotes the expression of stress-response genes, enhances mitochondrial function, and modulates intracellular calcium signaling, which is critical for maintaining contractility under stress conditions.

VEGF has been shown to interact with intracellular angiogenin, another intracrine involved in endothelial cell survival. This interaction establishes a feedback loop where VEGF upregulates angiogenin, which, in turn, enhances VEGF expression. This loop suggests that intracrine VEGF may be a crucial component in the regulation of myocardial vascularization and repair.

==== Implications for cardiovascular disease and therapy ====
Understanding VEGF's intracrine role in the heart opens new avenues for therapeutic intervention in cardiovascular diseases. Unlike traditional VEGF-targeted therapies that focus on extracellular angiogenesis, modulating intracrine VEGF could provide a more cell-specific approach to enhancing cardiac repair and regeneration. Targeting intracrine VEGF pathways may offer novel strategies for treating ischemic heart disease, heart failure, and other cardiovascular pathologies where vascular dysfunction is a contributing factor.

In conclusion, VEGF functions not only as an extracellular angiogenic factor but also as an intracrine regulator of cardiac cell survival and development. Future research into intracrine VEGF mechanisms may provide critical insights into cardiac regeneration and the development of more effective cardiovascular therapies.

=== The importance of intracrines in the cardiovascular system ===
Intracrines play a crucial role in the cardiovascular system by exerting intracellular actions that go beyond traditional extracellular signaling pathways. These factors, including VEGF, PTHrP, and Angiotensin II, influence key processes such as cardiac development, hypertrophy, fibrosis, angiogenesis, and electrical conductivity. By operating within the cells that synthesize them, intracrines regulate gene expression, protein synthesis, and intracellular signaling, allowing for precise control over physiological and pathological responses.

The recognition of intracrine signaling has significant implications for cardiovascular disease treatment. Understanding the intracellular mechanisms of these factors opens new therapeutic avenues, particularly for conditions such as heart failure, ischemic heart disease, and arrhythmias. Targeting intracrine pathways could lead to more effective interventions by modulating disease progression at the cellular level rather than relying solely on extracellular receptor blockade. As research continues to uncover the complexities of intracrine physiology, it holds promise for the development of innovative strategies to improve cardiovascular health.

== Intracrines in biology and development ==
Intracrines are essential regulators of cellular differentiation and development. The intracellular mode of action allows for highly localized and sustained control over developmental processes, particularly in stem cell differentiation, organogenesis, and tissue remodeling.

=== Intracrines in stem cell differentiation ===
Stem cell differentiation into various animal tissue types

Intracrines play a crucial role in maintaining stem cell populations and guiding their differentiation into specialized cell types. Many stem cell regulatory proteins, including vascular endothelial growth factor (VEGF), high-mobility group protein B1 (HMGB1), and homeodomain transcription factors such as Pax6 and Oct3/4, operate through intracrine mechanisms. These factors establish intracellular feedback loops that sustain differentiation programs, ensuring that once a stem cell commits to a particular lineage, the developmental process continues even after the external signal is removed.

For instance, VEGF, a well-known angiogenic factor, is also an intracrine that promotes the survival and differentiation of hematopoietic stem cells. In VEGF-deficient cells, survival and colony formation are impaired, but these defects can be rescued by restoring intracellular VEGF levels, highlighting the necessity of intracrine VEGF in stem cell regulation. Similarly, the homeodomain transcription factor Pdx-1 can be internalized by target cells, where it upregulates its own synthesis and drives pancreatic duct cells toward an insulin-producing phenotype, demonstrating the ability of intracrines to induce cell fate changes.

=== Intracrines in organogenesis ===
The development of organs relies on complex signaling interactions that regulate cell proliferation, migration, and differentiation. Intracrines such as dynorphin B and transforming growth factor-beta (TGF-β) have been implicated in cardiac development, promoting the differentiation of cardiac progenitor cells and guiding their maturation into functional cardiomyocytes. In cardiac embryogenesis, intracrine feedback loops involving dynorphin B and Nkx-2.5 (a homeodomain transcription factor) have been shown to drive the expression of cardiac-specific genes, reinforcing the role of intracrines in orchestrating organ development.

Furthermore, intracrines contribute to the spatial and temporal regulation of developmental cues. Homeodomain proteins, which are critical for embryonic patterning, can be secreted and internalized by neighboring cells, enabling coordinated differentiation across tissues. This form of intracrine signaling ensures that developing structures, such as the eye or heart, maintain proper cellular identity and function.

=== Intracrines and regenerative Medicine ===
The discovery of intracrine loops in stem cell regulation has profound implications for regenerative medicine. Because intracrines can establish long-lasting differentiation programs, they offer potential therapeutic targets for tissue regeneration and repair. For example, in cardiac repair, HMGB1 has been shown to enhance the proliferation and differentiation of cardiac stem cells following myocardial infarction, suggesting that modulating intracrine pathways could improve heart regeneration.

The ability of certain intracrines to reprogram cells into pluripotent-like states also opens new avenues for regenerative therapies. Oct3/4, Sox2, and Nanog, all of which are involved in maintaining stem cell pluripotency, can potentially be introduced into cells to drive reprogramming without the need for genetic modification. This approach could provide safer and more controlled methods for generating patient-specific stem cells.

=== Conclusion ===
Intracrines are fundamental to development, acting as intracellular regulators that guide stem cell differentiation, organogenesis, and tissue remodeling. By establishing self-sustaining feedback loops, intracrines ensure that developmental programs continue even after the initial external signals disappear. Understanding these mechanisms not only provides insights into embryonic development but also offers promising strategies for regenerative medicine and tissue engineering. As research into intracrine biology advances, it holds the potential to revolutionize therapeutic approaches for organ repair, disease treatment, and stem cell-based therapies.

== Intracrines in biology and cancer ==
Intracrines involvement in cancer is primarily through their regulation of growth factors, angiogenesis, and cellular signaling networks that contribute to tumor growth and therapy resistance.

=== Growth and proliferation ===
Intracrines such as fibroblast growth factor-2 (FGF2), vascular endothelial growth factor (VEGF), and insulin-like growth factor-1 (IGF-1) regulate cellular proliferation. In cancer, these factors often establish self-sustaining feed-forward loops, enhancing uncontrolled tumor growth. For example, VEGF's intracrine action is implicated in hematopoietic malignancies, while angiogenin has been identified in the nuclei of breast cancer cells, where it promotes proliferation.

=== Angiogenesis ===
The formation of new blood vessels is essential for tumor survival and expansion. Intracrines like VEGF and angiogenin regulate angiogenesis within tumor cells and surrounding endothelial cells. Inhibiting intracrine trafficking of angiogenin to the nucleus has been shown to blunt cancer cell proliferation, making this an emerging therapeutic target.

== See also ==
- Local hormone
- Autocrine signalling
- Growth factor
- Endocrine
- Paracrine Signaling
- Cell membrane
- Sex hormone
