= Autocrine signaling =

Signaling within the same cell

A model of autocrine signaling.

Autocrine signaling is a form of cell signaling in which a cell secretes a hormone or chemical messenger (called the autocrine agent) that binds to autocrine receptors on that same cell, leading to changes in the cell. This can be contrasted with paracrine signaling, intracrine signaling, or classical endocrine signaling.

== Examples ==
An example of an autocrine agent is the cytokine interleukin-1 in monocytes. When interleukin-1 is produced in response to external stimuli, it can bind to cell-surface receptors on the same cell that produced it.

Another example occurs in activated T cell lymphocytes, i.e., when a T cell is induced to mature by binding to a peptide:MHC complex on a professional antigen-presenting cell and by the B7:CD28 costimulatory signal. Upon activation, "low-affinity" IL-2 receptors are replaced by "high-affinity" IL-2 receptors consisting of α, β, and γ chains. The cell then releases IL-2, which binds to its own new IL-2 receptors, causing self-stimulation and ultimately a monoclonal population of T cells. These T cells can then go on to perform effector functions such as macrophage activation, B cell activation, and cell-mediated cytotoxicity.

== Cancer ==
Tumor development is a complex process that requires cell division, growth, and survival. One approach used by tumors to upregulate growth and survival is through autocrine production of growth and survival factors. Autocrine signaling plays critical roles in cancer activation and also in providing self-sustaining growth signals to tumors.

=== In the Wnt pathway ===
Normally, the Wnt signaling pathway leads to stabilization of β-catenin through inactivation of a protein complex containing the tumor suppressors APC and Axin. This destruction complex normally triggers β-catenin phosphorylation, inducing its degradation. De-regulation of the autocrine Wnt signaling pathway via mutations in APC and Axin have been linked to activation of various types of human cancer. Genetic alterations that lead to de-regulation of the autocrine Wnt pathway result in transactivation of epidermal growth factor receptor (EGFR) and other pathways, in turn contributing to proliferation of tumor cells. In colorectal cancer, for example, mutations in APC, axin, or β-catenin promote β-catenin stabilization and transcription of genes encoding cancer-associated proteins. Furthermore, in human breast cancer, interference with the de-regulated Wnt signaling pathway reduces proliferation and survival of cancer. These findings suggest that interference with Wnt signaling at the ligand-receptor level may improve the effectiveness of cancer therapies.

=== IL-6 ===
Interleukin 6 (acronym: IL-6) is a cytokine that is important for many aspects of cellular biology including immune responses, cell survival, apoptosis, as well as proliferation. Several studies have outlined the importance of autocrine IL-6 signaling in lung and breast cancers. For example, one group found a positive correlation between persistently activated tyrosine-phosphorylated STAT3 (pSTAT3), found in 50% of lung adenocarcinomas, and IL-6. Further investigation revealed that mutant EGFR could activate the oncogenic STAT3 pathway via upregulated IL-6 autocrine signaling.

Similarly, HER2 overexpression occurs in approximately a quarter of breast cancers and correlates with poor prognosis. Recent research revealed that IL-6 secretion induced by HER2 overexpression activated STAT3 and altered gene expression, resulting in an autocrine loop of IL-6/STAT3 expression. Both mouse and human in vivo models of HER2-overexpressing breast cancers relied critically on this HER2–IL-6–STAT3 signaling pathway. Another group found that high serum levels of IL-6 correlated with poor outcome in breast cancer tumors. Their research showed that autocrine IL-6 signaling induced malignant features in Notch-3 expressing mammospheres.

=== IL-7 ===
A study demonstrates how the autocrine production of the IL-7 cytokine mediated by T-cell acute lymphoblastic leukemia (T-ALL) can be involved in the oncogenic development of T-ALL and offer novel insights into T-ALL spreading.

=== VEGF ===
Another agent involved in autocrine cancer signaling is vascular endothelial growth factor (VEGF). VEGF, produced by carcinoma cells, acts through paracrine signaling on endothelial cells and through autocrine signaling on carcinoma cells. Evidence shows that autocrine VEGF is involved in two major aspects of invasive carcinoma: survival and migration. Moreover, it was shown that tumor progression selects for cells that are VEGF-dependent, challenging the belief that VEGF's role in cancer is limited to angiogenesis. Instead, this research suggests that VEGF receptor-targeted therapeutics may impair cancer survival and invasion as well as angiogenesis.

=== Promotion of metastasis ===
Metastasis is a major cause of cancer deaths, and strategies to prevent or halt invasion are lacking. One study showed that autocrine PDGFR signaling plays an essential role in epithelial-mesenchymal transition (EMT) maintenance in vitro, which is known to correlate well with metastasis in vivo. The authors showed that the metastatic potential of oncogenic mammary epithelial cells required an autocrine PDGF/PDGFR signaling loop, and that cooperation of autocrine PDGFR signaling with oncogenic was required for survival during EMT. Autocrine PDGFR signaling also contributes to maintenance of EMT, possibly through activation of STAT1 and other distinct pathways. In addition, expression of PDGFRα and -β correlated with invasive behavior in human mammary carcinomas. This indicates the numerous pathways through which autocrine signaling can regulate metastatic processes in a tumor.

=== Development of therapeutic targets ===
The growing knowledge behind the mechanism of autocrine signaling in cancer progression has revealed new approaches for therapeutic treatment. For example, autocrine Wnt signaling could provide a novel target for therapeutic intervention by means of Wnt antagonists or other molecules that interfere with ligand-receptor interactions of the Wnt pathway. In addition, VEGF-A production and VEGFR-2 activation on the surface of breast cancer cells indicates the presence of a distinct autocrine signaling loop that enables breast cancer cells to promote their own growth and survival by phosphorylation and activation of VEGFR-2. This autocrine loop is another example of an attractive therapeutic target.

In HER2 overexpressing breast cancers, the HER2–IL-6–STAT3 signaling relationship could be targeted to develop new therapeutic strategies. HER2 kinase inhibitors, such as lapatinib, have also demonstrated clinical efficacy in HER2 overexpressing breast cancers by disrupting a neuregulin-1 (NRG1)-mediated autocrine loop.

In the case of PDGFR signalling, overexpression of a dominant-negative PDGFR or application of the cancer drug STI571 are both approaches being explored to therapeutically interference with metastasis in mice.

In addition, drugs may be developed that activate autocrine signaling in cancer cells that would not otherwise occur. For example, a small-molecule mimetic of Smac/Diablo that counteracts the inhibition of apoptosis has been shown to enhance apoptosis caused by chemotherapeutic drugs through autocrine-secreted tumor necrosis factor alpha (TNFα). In response to autocrine TNFα signaling, the Smac mimetic promotes formation of a RIPK1-dependent caspase-8-activating complex, leading to apoptosis.

=== Role in drug resistance ===
Recent studies have reported the ability of drug-resistant cancer cells to acquire mitogenic signals from previously neglected autocrine loops, causing tumor recurrence.

For example, despite widespread expression of epidermal growth factor receptors (EGFRs) and EGF family ligands in non-small-cell lung cancer (NSCLC), EGFR-specific tyrosine kinase inhibitors such as gefitinib have shown limited therapeutic success. This resistance is proposed to be because autocrine growth signaling pathways distinct from EGFR are active in NSCLC cells. Gene expression profiling revealed the prevalence of specific fibroblast growth factors (FGFs) and FGF receptors in NSCLC cell lines, and found that FGF2, FGF9 and their receptors encompass a growth factor autocrine loop that is active in a subset of gefitinib-resistant NSCLC cell lines.

In breast cancer, the acquisition of tamoxifen resistance is another major therapeutic problem. It has been shown that phosphorylation of STAT3 and RANTES expression are increased in response to tamoxifen in human breast cancer cells. In a recent study, one group showed that STAT3 and RANTES contribute to the maintenance of drug resistance by upregulating anti-apoptotic signals and inhibiting caspase cleavage. These mechanisms of STAT3-RANTES autocrine signaling suggest a novel strategy for management of patients with tamoxifen-resistant tumors.

== See also ==
- Paracrine signaling is a form of cell-cell communication in which a cell produces a signal to induce changes in nearby cells, altering the behavior or differentiation of nearby cells.
- Intracrine
- Local hormone
- Endocrine system
