= Chemical messenger =

A chemical messenger is any compound that serves to transmit a message, and may refer to:

- Hormone, long range chemical messenger
- Neurotransmitter, communicates to adjacent cells
- Neuropeptide, a protein sequence which acts as a hormone or neurotransmitter
- Pheromone, a chemical factor that triggers a social response in members of the same species

== See also ==
- Cell signaling
