= Hormone =

Biological signalling molecule

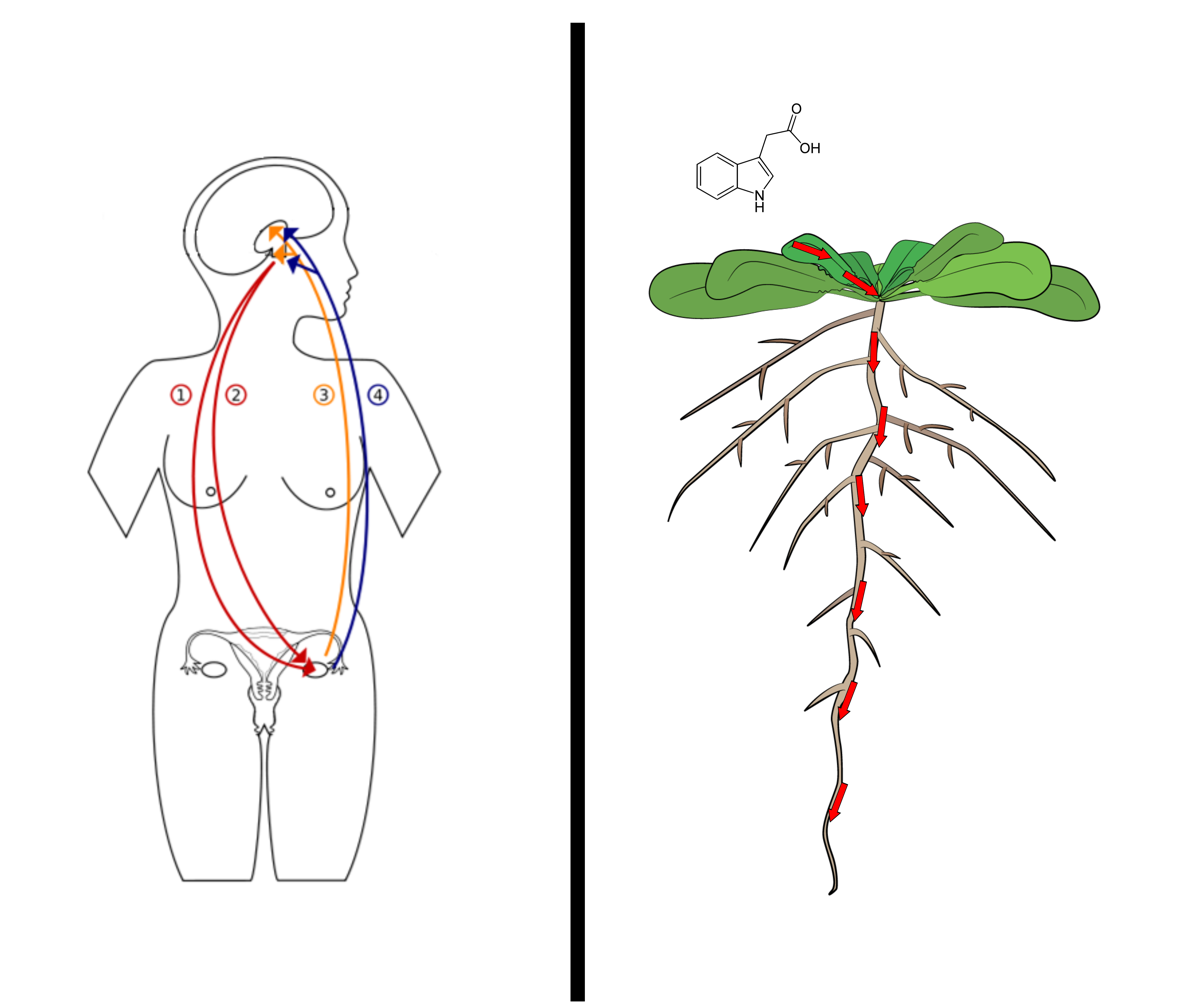
Left: A hormone feedback loop in a female adult human: (1) follicle-stimulating hormone; (2) luteinizing hormone; (3) progesterone; (4) estradiol; Right: Auxin transport from leaves to roots in Arabidopsis thaliana

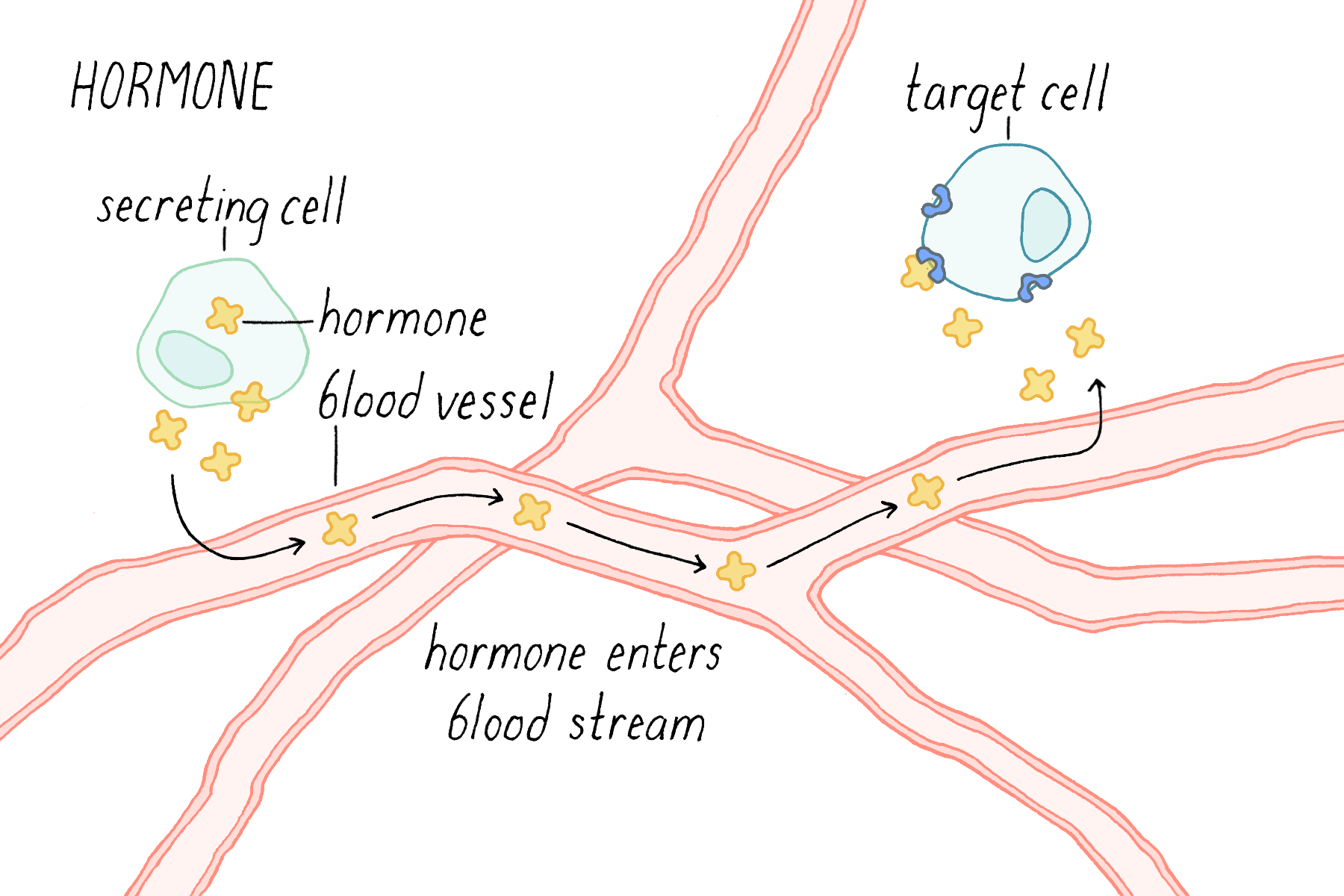
A hormone is a secreted protein or chemical that is transported in blood or other body fluids to stimulate cells in other tissues to perform specific actions.

A hormone (from Ancient Greek ὁρμῶν (hormôn) 'setting in motion') is a class of signaling molecules in multicellular organisms that are sent to distant organs or tissues by complex biological processes to regulate physiology and behavior. Hormones are required for the normal development of animals, plants and fungi.

Due to the broad definition of a hormone (as a signaling molecule that exerts its effects far from its site of production), numerous kinds of molecules can be classified as hormones. Substances that can be considered hormones include eicosanoids (e.g. prostaglandins and thromboxanes), steroids (e.g. oestrogen and brassinosteroid), amino acid derivatives (e.g. epinephrine and auxin), protein or peptides (e.g. insulin and CLE peptides), and gases (e.g. ethylene and nitric oxide).

Hormones are used to communicate between organs and tissues. In vertebrates, hormones are responsible for regulating a wide range of processes including both physiological processes and behavioral activities such as digestion, metabolism, respiration, sensory perception, sleep, excretion, lactation, stress induction, growth and development, movement, reproduction, and mood manipulation. In plants, hormones modulate almost all aspects of development, from germination to senescence.

Hormones affect distant cells by binding to specific receptor proteins in the target cell, resulting in a change in cell function. When a hormone binds to the receptor, it results in the activation of a signal transduction pathway that typically activates gene transcription, resulting in increased expression of target proteins. Hormones can also act in non-genomic pathways that synergize with genomic effects.

Water-soluble hormones (such as peptides and amines) generally act on the surface of target cells via second messengers. Lipid soluble hormones, (such as steroids) generally pass through the plasma membrane of target cells (both cytoplasmic and nuclear) to act within their nuclei. Brassinosteroids, a type of polyhydroxysteroids, are a sixth class of plant hormones and may be useful as an anticancer drug for endocrine-responsive tumors to cause apoptosis and limit plant growth. Despite being lipid soluble, they nevertheless attach to their receptor at the cell surface.

In vertebrates, endocrine glands are specialized organs that secrete hormones into the endocrine signaling system. Hormone secretion occurs in response to specific biochemical signals and is often subject to negative feedback regulation. For instance, high blood sugar (serum glucose concentration) promotes insulin synthesis. Insulin then acts to reduce glucose levels and maintain homeostasis, leading to reduced insulin levels.

Upon secretion, water-soluble hormones are readily transported through the circulatory system. Lipid-soluble hormones must bind to carrier plasma glycoproteins (e.g., thyroxine-binding globulin (TBG)) to form ligand-protein complexes. Some hormones, such as insulin and growth hormones, can be released into the bloodstream already fully active. Other hormones, called prohormones, must be activated in certain cells through a series of steps that are usually tightly controlled.

The endocrine system secretes hormones directly into the bloodstream, typically via fenestrated capillaries, whereas the exocrine system secretes its hormones indirectly using ducts. Hormones with paracrine function diffuse through the interstitial spaces to nearby target tissue.

Plants lack specialized organs for the secretion of hormones, although there is a spatial distribution of hormone production. For example, the hormone auxin is produced mainly at the tips of young leaves and in the shoot apical meristem. The lack of specialised glands means that the main site of hormone production can change throughout the life of a plant, and the site of production is dependent on the plant's age and environment.

== Introduction and overview ==
Hormone producing cells are found in the endocrine glands, such as the thyroid gland, ovaries, and testes. Hormonal signaling involves the following steps:

1. Biosynthesis of a particular hormone in a particular tissue.
2. Storage and secretion of the hormone.
3. Transport of the hormone to the target cell(s).
4. Recognition of the hormone by an associated cell membrane or intracellular receptor protein.
5. Relay and amplification of the received hormonal signal via a signal transduction process: This then leads to a cellular response. The reaction of the target cells may then be recognized by the original hormone-producing cells, leading to a downregulation in hormone production. This is an example of a homeostatic negative feedback loop.
6. Breakdown of the hormone.

Exocytosis and other methods of membrane transport are used to secrete hormones when the endocrine glands are signaled. The hierarchical model is an oversimplification of the hormonal signaling process. Cellular recipients of a particular hormonal signal may be one of several cell types that reside within a number of different tissues, as is the case for insulin, which triggers a diverse range of systemic physiological effects. Different tissue types may also respond differently to the same hormonal signal.

== Discovery ==
=== Arnold Adolph Berthold (1849) ===
Arnold Adolph Berthold was a German physiologist and zoologist, who, in 1849, had a question about the function of the testes. He noticed in castrated roosters that they did not have the same sexual behaviors as roosters with their testes intact. He decided to run an experiment on male roosters to examine this phenomenon. He kept a group of roosters with their testes intact, and saw that they had normally sized wattles and combs (secondary sexual organs), a normal crow, and normal sexual and aggressive behaviors. He also had a group with their testes surgically removed, and noticed that their secondary sexual organs were decreased in size, had a weak crow, did not have sexual attraction towards females, and were not aggressive. He realized that this organ was essential for these behaviors, but he did not know how. To test this further, he removed one testis and placed it in the abdominal cavity. The roosters acted and had normal physical anatomy. He was able to see that the location of the testes does not matter. He then wanted to see if it was a genetic factor that was involved in the testes that provided these functions. He transplanted a testis from another rooster to a rooster with one testis removed, and saw that they had normal behavior and physical anatomy as well. Berthold determined that the location or genetic factors of the testes do not matter in relation to sexual organs and behaviors, but that some chemical in the testes is being secreted is causing this phenomenon. It was later identified that this factor was the hormone testosterone.

=== Charles and Francis Darwin (1880) ===
Although known primarily for his work on the Theory of Evolution, Charles Darwin was also keenly interested in plants. Through the 1870s, he and his son Francis studied the movement of plants towards light. They were able to show that light is perceived at the tip of a young stem (the coleoptile), whereas the bending occurs lower down the stem. They proposed that a 'transmissible substance' communicated the direction of light from the tip down to the stem. The idea of a 'transmissible substance' was initially dismissed by other plant biologists, but their work later led to the discovery of the first plant hormone. In the 1920s Dutch scientist Frits Warmolt Went and Russian scientist Nikolai Cholodny (working independently of each other) conclusively showed that asymmetric accumulation of a growth hormone was responsible for this bending. In 1933 this hormone was finally isolated by Kögl, Haagen-Smit and Erxleben and given the name 'auxin'.

=== Oliver and Schäfer (1894) ===
British physician George Oliver and physiologist Edward Albert Schäfer, professor at University College London, collaborated on the physiological effects of adrenal extracts. They first published their findings in two reports in 1894, a full publication followed in 1895. Though frequently falsely attributed to secretin, found in 1902 by Bayliss and Starling, Oliver and Schäfer's adrenal extract containing adrenaline, the substance causing the physiological changes, was the first hormone to be discovered. The term hormone would later be coined by Starling.

=== Bayliss and Starling (1902) ===
William Bayliss and Ernest Starling, a physiologist and biologist respectively, wanted to see if the nervous system had an impact on the digestive system. From the work of Martin Heidenhain and Claude Bernard, they knew that the pancreas was involved in the secretion of digestive fluids after the passage of food from the stomach to the intestines, which they believed to be due to the nervous system. They cut the nerves to the pancreas in an animal model and discovered that it was not nerve impulses that controlled secretion from the pancreas. It was determined that a factor secreted from the intestines into the bloodstream was stimulating the pancreas to secrete digestive fluids. This was named secretin: a hormone.

In 1905, Starling coined the word hormone from the Greek to arouse or excite which he defined as "the chemical messengers which speeding from cell to cell along the blood stream, may coordinate the activities and growth of different parts of the body".

== Types of signaling ==
Hormonal effects are dependent on where they are released, as they can be released in different manners. Not all hormones are released from a cell and into the blood until it binds to a receptor on a target. The major types of hormone signaling are:

Signaling Types – Hormones
SN	Types	Description
1	Endocrine	Acts on the target cells after being released into the bloodstream.
2	Paracrine	Acts on the nearby cells and does not have to enter general circulation.
3	Autocrine	Affects the cell types that secreted it and causes a biological effect.
4	Intracrine	Acts intracellularly on the cells that synthesized it.

== Chemical classes ==
As hormones are defined functionally, not structurally, they may have diverse chemical structures. Hormones occur in multicellular organisms (plants, animals, fungi, brown algae, and red algae). These compounds occur also in unicellular organisms, and may act as signaling molecules however there is no agreement that these molecules can be called hormones.

=== Vertebrates ===
Hormone types in Vertebrates
SN	Types	Description
1	Proteins and Peptides	Peptide hormones are made of a chain of amino acids that can range from just 3 to hundreds. Examples include oxytocin and insulin. Their sequences are encoded in DNA and can be modified by alternative splicing and/or post-translational modification. They are packed in vesicles and are hydrophilic, meaning that they are soluble in water. Due to their hydrophilicity, they can only bind to receptors on the membrane, as travelling through the membrane is unlikely. However, some hormones can bind to intracellular receptors through an intracrine mechanism.
2	Amino Acid Derivatives	Amino acid hormones are derived from amino acids, most commonly Tyrosine. They are stored in vesicles. Examples include Melatonin and Thyroxine.
3	Steroids	Steroid hormones are derived from cholesterol. Examples include the sex hormones estradiol and testosterone as well as the stress hormone cortisol. Steroids contain four fused rings. They are lipophilic and hence can cross membranes to bind to intracellular nuclear receptors.
4	Eicosanoids	Eicosanoids hormones are derived from lipids such as arachidonic acid, lipoxins, thromboxanes and prostaglandins. Examples include prostaglandin and thromboxane. These hormones are produced by cyclooxygenases and lipoxygenases. They are hydrophobic and act on membrane receptors.
5	Gases	Ethylene and Nitric Oxide

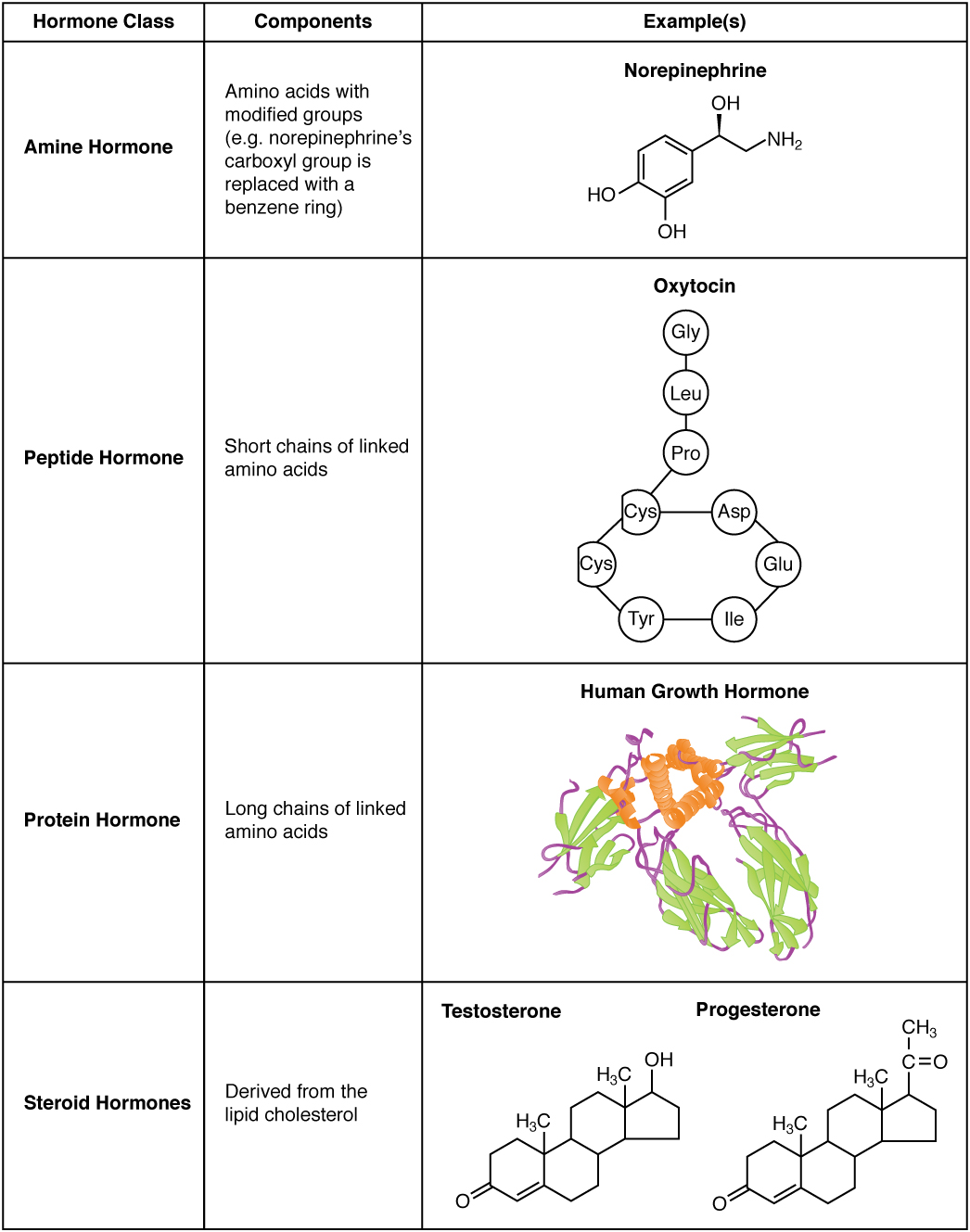
Different types of hormones are secreted in the human body, with different biological roles and functions.

=== Invertebrates ===
Compared with vertebrates, insects and crustaceans possess a number of structurally unusual hormones such as the juvenile hormone, a sesquiterpenoid.

=== Plants ===
Examples include abscisic acid, auxin, cytokinin, ethylene, and gibberellin.

== Receptors ==
The left diagram shows a steroid (lipid) hormone (1) entering a cell and (2) binding to a receptor protein in the nucleus, causing (3) mRNA synthesis which is the first step of protein synthesis. The right side shows protein hormones (1) binding with receptors which (2) begins a transduction pathway. The transduction pathway ends (3) with transcription factors being activated in the nucleus, and protein synthesis beginning. In both diagrams, a is the hormone, b is the cell membrane, c is the cytoplasm, and d is the nucleus.

Most hormones initiate a cellular response by initially binding to either cell surface receptors or intracellular receptors. A cell may have several different receptors that recognize the same hormone but activate different signal transduction pathways, or a cell may have several different receptors that recognize different hormones and activate the same biochemical pathway.

Receptors for most peptide as well as many eicosanoid hormones are embedded in the cell membrane as cell surface receptors, and the majority of these belong to the G protein-coupled receptor (GPCR) class of seven alpha helix transmembrane proteins. The interaction of hormone and receptor typically triggers a cascade of secondary effects within the cytoplasm of the cell, described as signal transduction, often involving phosphorylation or dephosphorylation of various other cytoplasmic proteins, changes in ion channel permeability, or increased concentrations of intracellular molecules that may act as secondary messengers (e.g., cyclic AMP). Some protein hormones also interact with intracellular receptors located in the cytoplasm or nucleus by an intracrine mechanism.

For steroid or thyroid hormones, their receptors are located inside the cell within the cytoplasm of the target cell. These receptors belong to the nuclear receptor family of ligand-activated transcription factors. To bind their receptors, these hormones must first cross the cell membrane. They can do so because they are lipid-soluble. The combined hormone-receptor complex then moves across the nuclear membrane into the nucleus of the cell, where it binds to specific DNA sequences, regulating the expression of certain genes, and thereby increasing the levels of the proteins encoded by these genes. However, it has been shown that not all steroid receptors are located inside the cell. Some are associated with the plasma membrane.

== Effects in humans ==
Hormones have the following effects on the body:

- stimulation or inhibition of growth
- wake-sleep cycle and other circadian rhythms
- mood swings
- induction or suppression of apoptosis (programmed cell death)
- activation or inhibition of the immune system
- regulation of metabolism
- preparation of the body for mating, fighting, fleeing, and other activity
- preparation of the body for a new phase of life, such as puberty, parenting, and menopause
- control of the reproductive cycle
- hunger cravings

A hormone may also regulate the production and release of other hormones. Hormone signals control the internal environment of the body through homeostasis.

== Regulation ==
The rate of hormone biosynthesis and secretion is often regulated by a homeostatic negative feedback control mechanism. Such a mechanism depends on factors that influence the metabolism and excretion of hormones. Thus, higher hormone concentration alone cannot trigger the negative feedback mechanism. Negative feedback must be triggered by overproduction of an "effect" of the hormone.

Blood glucose levels are maintained at a constant level in the body by a negative feedback mechanism. When the blood glucose level is too high, the pancreas secretes insulin and when the level is too low, the pancreas then secretes glucagon. The flat line shown represents the homeostatic set point. The sinusoidal line represents the blood glucose level.

Hormone secretion can be stimulated and inhibited by:

- Other hormones (stimulating- or releasing -hormones)
- Plasma concentrations of ions or nutrients, as well as binding globulins
- Neurons and mental activity
- Environmental changes, e.g., of light or temperature

One special group of hormones is the tropic hormones that stimulate the hormone production of other endocrine glands. For example, thyroid-stimulating hormone (TSH) causes growth and increased activity of another endocrine gland, the thyroid, which increases output of thyroid hormones.

To release active hormones quickly into the circulation, hormone biosynthetic cells may produce and store biologically inactive hormones in the form of pre- or prohormones. These can then be quickly converted into their active hormone form in response to a particular stimulus.

Eicosanoids are considered to act as local hormones. They are considered to be "local" because they possess specific effects on target cells close to their site of formation. They also have a rapid degradation cycle, making sure they do not reach distant sites within the body.

Hormones are also regulated by receptor agonists. Hormones are ligands, which are any kinds of molecules that produce a signal by binding to a receptor site on a protein. Hormone effects can be inhibited, thus regulated, by competing ligands that bind to the same target receptor as the hormone in question. When a competing ligand is bound to the receptor site, the hormone is unable to bind to that site and is unable to elicit a response from the target cell. These competing ligands are called antagonists of the hormone.

== Therapeutic use ==
Many hormones and their structural and functional analogs are used as medication. The most commonly prescribed hormones are estrogens and progestogens (as methods of hormonal contraception and as HRT), thyroxine (as levothyroxine, for hypothyroidism) and steroids (for autoimmune diseases and several respiratory disorders). Insulin is used by many diabetics. Local preparations for use in otolaryngology often contain pharmacologic equivalents of adrenaline, while steroid and vitamin D creams are used extensively in dermatological practice.

A "pharmacologic dose" or "supraphysiological dose" of a hormone is a medical usage referring to an amount of a hormone far greater than naturally occurs in a healthy body. The effects of pharmacologic doses of hormones may be different from responses to naturally occurring amounts and may be therapeutically useful, though not without potentially adverse side effects. An example is the ability of pharmacologic doses of glucocorticoids to suppress inflammation.

== Hormone-behavior interactions ==
At the neurological level, behavior can be inferred based on hormone concentration, which in turn are influenced by hormone-release patterns; the numbers and locations of hormone receptors; and the efficiency of hormone receptors for those involved in gene transcription. Hormone concentration does not incite behavior, as that would undermine other external stimuli; however, it influences the system by increasing the probability of a certain event to occur.

Not only can hormones influence behavior, but also behavior and the environment can influence hormone concentration. Thus, a feedback loop is formed, meaning behavior can affect hormone concentration, which in turn can affect behavior, which in turn can affect hormone concentration, and so on. For example, hormone-behavior feedback loops are essential in providing constancy to episodic hormone secretion, as the behaviors affected by episodically secreted hormones directly prevent the continuous release of said hormones.

Three broad stages of reasoning may be used to determine if a specific hormone-behavior interaction is present within a system:

- The frequency of occurrence of a hormonally dependent behavior should correspond to that of its hormonal source.
- A hormonally dependent behavior is not expected if the hormonal source (or its types of action) is non-existent.
- The reintroduction of a missing behaviorally dependent hormonal source (or its types of action) is expected to bring back the absent behavior.

== Comparison with neurotransmitters ==
Though colloquially oftentimes used interchangeably, there are various clear distinctions between hormones and neurotransmitters:

- A hormone can perform functions over a larger spatial and temporal scale than can a neurotransmitter, which often acts in micrometer-scale distances.
- Hormonal signals can travel virtually anywhere in the circulatory system, whereas neural signals are restricted to pre-existing nerve tracts.
- Assuming the travel distance is equivalent, neural signals can be transmitted much more quickly (in the range of milliseconds) than can hormonal signals (in the range of seconds, minutes, or hours). Neural signals can be sent at speeds up to 100 meters per second.
- Neural signalling is an all-or-nothing (digital) action, whereas hormonal signalling is an action that can be continuously variable as it is dependent upon hormone concentration.

Neurohormones are a type of hormone that share a commonality with neurotransmitters. They are produced by endocrine cells that receive input from neurons, or neuroendocrine cells. Both classic hormones and neurohormones are secreted by endocrine tissue; however, neurohormones are the result of a combination between endocrine reflexes and neural reflexes, creating a neuroendocrine pathway. While endocrine pathways produce chemical signals in the form of hormones, the neuroendocrine pathway involves the electrical signals of neurons. In this pathway, the result of the electrical signal produced by a neuron is the release of a chemical, which is the neurohormone. Finally, like a classic hormone, the neurohormone is released into the bloodstream to reach its target.

== Binding proteins ==
Diagram that describes hormones and their activity in the bloodstream. Hormones flow in and out of the bloodstream and are able to bind to target cells to activate the role of the hormone. This is with the help of the bloodstream flow and the secreting cell. Hormones regulate metabolism, growth and development, tissue function, sleep, reproduction, etc. The diagram also lists the important hormones in humans.

Hormone transport and the involvement of binding proteins is an essential aspect when considering the function of hormones. The formation of a complex with a binding protein has several benefits: the effective half-life of the bound hormone is increased, and a reservoir of bound hormones is created, which evens the variations in concentration of unbound hormones (bound hormones will replace the unbound hormones when these are eliminated). An example of the usage of hormone-binding proteins is in the thyroxine-binding protein which carries up to 80% of all thyroxine in the body, a crucial element in regulating the metabolic rate.

== See also ==
- Adipokine
- Autocrine signaling
- Cytokine
- Endocrine disease
- Endocrine system
- Endocrinology
- Environmental hormones
- Growth factor
- Hepatokine
- Intracrine
- List of human hormones
- List of investigational sex-hormonal agents
- Metabolomics
- Myokine
- Neohormone
- Neuroendocrinology
- Paracrine signaling
- Plant hormones, a.k.a. plant growth regulators
- Semiochemical
- Sex-hormonal agent
- Sexual motivation and hormones
- Xenohormone
