= Prehormone =

Class of chemical compounds

A prehormone is a biochemical substance secreted by glandular tissue and has minimal or no significant biological activity, but it is converted in peripheral tissues into an active hormone. Calcifediol is an example of a prehormone which is produced by hydroxylation of vitamin D_{3} (cholecalciferol) in the liver. Another example is adrenal androgens like dehydroepiandrosterone and androstenedione, which can be converted into testosterone and dihydrotestosterone.

== See also ==
- Prohormone
