= Peptide hormone =

Hormone whose molecules are peptides

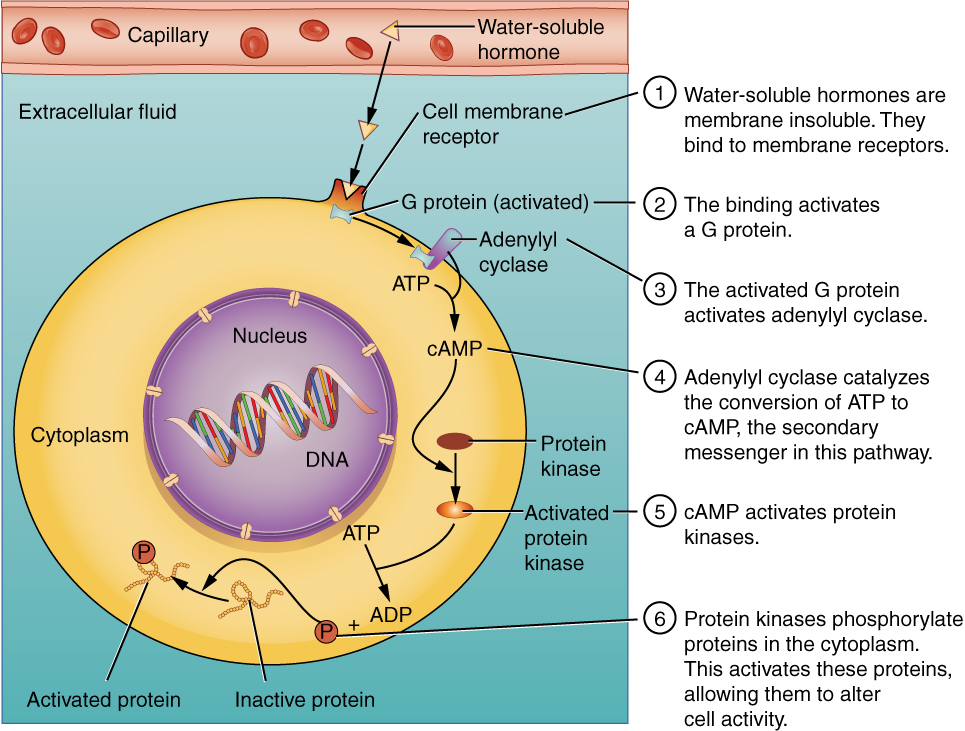
Illustration showing the binding of a peptide hormone to a cell receptor

Peptide hormones are hormones composed of peptide molecules. These hormones influence the endocrine system of animals, including humans. Most hormones are classified as either amino-acid-based hormones (amines, peptides, or proteins) or steroid hormones. Amino-acid-based hormones are water-soluble and act on target cells via second messenger systems, whereas steroid hormones, being lipid-soluble, diffuse through plasma membranes to interact directly with intracellular receptors in the cell nucleus.

Like all peptides, peptide hormones are synthesized in cells from amino acids based on mRNA transcripts, which are derived from DNA templates inside the cell nucleus. The initial precursors, known as preprohormones, undergo processing in the endoplasmic reticulum. This includes the removal of the N-terminal signal peptide and, in some cases, glycosylation, yielding prohormones. These prohormones are then packaged into secretory vesicles, which are stored and released via exocytosis in response to specific stimuli, such as an increase in intracellular Ca^{2+} and cAMP levels.

Prohormones often contain extra amino acid sequences necessary for proper folding but not for hormonal activity. Specific endopeptidases cleave the prohormone before secretion, producing the mature, biologically active hormone. Once in the bloodstream, peptide hormones travel throughout the body and bind to specific receptors on target cell membranes.

Some neurotransmitters are secreted and released in a manner similar to peptide hormones, and certain "neuropeptides" function as both neurotransmitters in the nervous system and hormones in the bloodstream.

When a peptide hormone binds to its receptor on the cell surface, it activates a second messenger within the cytoplasm, triggering signal transduction pathways that lead to specific cellular responses.

Certain peptides, such as angiotensin II, basic fibroblast growth factor-2, and parathyroid hormone-related protein, can also interact with intracellular receptors in the cytoplasm or nucleus through an intracrine mechanism.

== Partial list of peptide hormones in humans ==
1. Adrenocorticotropic hormone (ACTH)
2. Adropin
3. Amylin
4. Angiotensin
5. Atrial natriuretic peptide (ANP)
6. Calcitonin
7. Cholecystokinin (CCK)
8. Gastrin
9. Ghrelin
10. Glucagon
11. Glucose-dependent insulinotropic polypeptide (GIP)
12. Glucagon-like peptide-1 (GLP-1)
13. Growth hormone
14. Follicle-stimulating hormone (FSH)
15. Human chorionic gonadotropin (hCG)
16. Insulin
17. Leptin
18. Luteinizing hormone (LH)
19. Melanocyte-stimulating hormone (MSH)
20. Orexin/Hypocretin
21. Oxytocin
22. Parathyroid hormone (PTH)
23. Prolactin
24. Renin
25. Somatostatin
26. Thyroid-stimulating hormone (TSH)
27. Thyrotropin-releasing hormone (TRH)
28. Vasopressin, also called arginine vasopressin (AVP) or anti-diuretic hormone (ADH)
29. Vasoactive intestinal peptide (VIP)
30. Somatotropin (GH1)
31. Gonadotropin Releasing Hormone 1 (GNRH1)
32. Gonadotropin Releasing Hormone 2 (GNRH2)
33. Growth Hormone Releasing Hormone (GHRH)
34. Parathyroid Hormone Like Hormone (PTHLH)
35. Corticotropin Releasing Hormone (CRH)
36. Anti-Müllerian Hormone (AMH)
37. Chorionic Somatomammotropin Hormone 1 (CSH1)
38. Chorionic Somatomammotropin Hormone 2 (CSH2)
39. Pro-Melanin Concentrating Hormone (PMCH)
40. Resistin (RETN)
