= Hermann Schloffer =

Austrian surgeon (1868–1937)

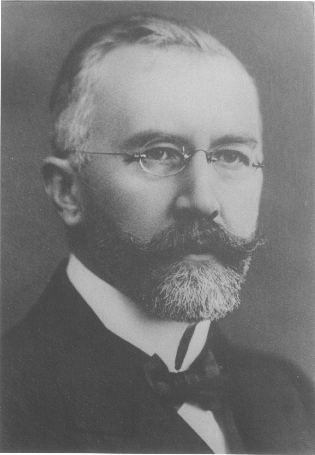
Hermann Schloffer

Hermann Schloffer (May 13, 1868 in Graz – January 21, 1937) was an Austrian surgeon.

He studied medicine at the University of Freiburg and University of Graz, where in 1892 he earned his medical doctorate. He spent several years in Prague as a surgical assistant and associate professor, and in 1903–1911 was a surgeon and professor at the University of Innsbruck. Afterwards he was a professor at Charles University in Prague.

On March 16, 1907, Schloffer performed the first transsphenoidal surgery for removal of a pituitary adenoma at the University of Innsbruck. The patient died several weeks afterwards from a residual tumor. His name is lent to the eponymous "Schloffer tumor", described as an uncommon pseudo-tumor of the abdominal wall that usually appears several years after abdominal surgery.

In 1916 Schloffer became the first to remove a spleen for idiopathic thrombocytopenic purpura (ITP). His student Paul Kaznelson (1898–1959) hypothesized – in analogy with hemolytic anemia – that the excessive destruction of platelets in ITP would occur in the spleen and suggested to his tutor Schloffer to perform a splenectomy on a patient with chronic ITP. Schloffer followed Kaznelson's suggestion. Their first patient so treated showed a dramatic improvement.

In 1933 he joined the fascist Fatherland Front, in which he remained a member until his death in 1937.
