= Pure red cell aplasia =

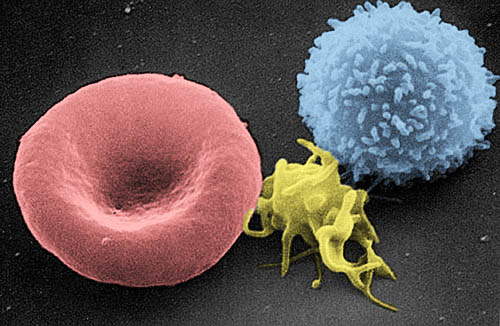
- Scanning electron micrograph of blood cells. From left to right: human red blood cell, thrombocyte (platelet), leukocyte. Pure red cell aplasia affects the red blood cells in particular.
- Specialty: Hematology

Pure red cell aplasia (PRCA) or erythroblastopenia is a type of aplastic anemia affecting the precursors to red blood cells but usually not to white blood cells. In PRCA, the bone marrow ceases to produce red blood cells. There are multiple etiologies that can cause PRCA. The condition has been first described by Paul Kaznelson in 1922.

== Signs and symptoms ==
Signs and symptoms may include:

- Pale appearance
- Rapid heart rate
- Fatigue

== Causes ==
Causes of PRCA include:

- Autoimmune disease.
- Thymoma.
- Viral infections such as HIV, herpes, parvovirus B19 (Fifth disease), or hepatitis.
- Lymphoproliferative. Association of pure red cell aplasia with T-cell large granular lymphocyte leukemia is well recognized, especially in China.
- Idiopathic. Many cases of PRCA are considered idiopathic in that there is no discernible cause detected.
- Drugs such as mycophenolic acid or erythropoietin.
- Congenital. The term "hereditary pure red cell aplasia" has been used to refer to Diamond–Blackfan anemia.

== Treatment ==
PRCA is considered an autoimmune disease as it will respond to immunosuppressant treatment such as cyclosporin in many patients, though this approach is not without risk.

It has also been shown to respond to treatments with rituximab and tacrolimus.

For cases related to B19 parvovirus, administration of commercial immunoglobulin can treat or cure parvovirus by replacing neutralizing antibodies.

== See also ==
- Diamond–Blackfan anemia (genetic red cell aplasia)
- Aplastic anemia (aplasia affecting other bone marrow cells as well)
