= Autoimmune disease in women =

Aspect of women's health

Autoimmunity refers to a pathological immune response of the body's immune system against itself. Autoimmune disease is widely recognized to be significantly more common in women than in men, and often presents differently between the sexes. In addition to gender, race and ethnicity can also play a role in prevalence rates. The reasons for these disparities are still under investigation, but may in part involve the presence of an additional X chromosome in women (given that several genes on the X chromosome are associated with immune system development), as well as the higher presence of female sex hormones such as estrogen (which increases immune system response). The risk, incidence, and character of autoimmune disease in women may also be associated with female-specific physiological changes, such as hormonal shifts during menses, pregnancy, and menopause.

Common autoimmune symptoms experienced by both sexes include rashes, fevers, fatigue, and joint pain. Symptoms which are specific to women include irregular menses, pelvic pain, or vaginal dryness, depending on the given disease. Some diseases such as Graves' disease, rheumatoid arthritis, and multiple sclerosis may improve during pregnancy, whereas others such as lupus may worsen.

Currently, it is not possible to cure autoimmune disease, but many treatments are available. Treatment of autoimmune disease can be broadly classified into anti-inflammatory, immunosuppressive, and palliative – i.e., correcting a functional disturbance related to the condition. Some medications used to treat autoimmune diseases might not be safe to use during pregnancy.

Specific roles of discrimination and disparities may impact women with autoimmune diseases in the categories of race and ethnicity, gaps in research, in workplaces, and in healthcare coverage and treatment. Accommodations can be instituted in workplaces, and homes, to balance disease profiles and conditions.

== Common diseases ==
Autoimmune Disease Cases by Sex
Disease	Ratio of female:male cases
Addison's disease	1.5:1
Ankylosing spondylitis	1:3 – 1:4
anti-GBM disease (Goodpasture syndrome)	1:2 – 1:9
Antiphospholipid syndrome	3.5:1
Autoimmune hepatitis	3:1
Behçet's disease	1:5 – 2:1
Celiac disease	1.5:1 – 2:1
Crohn's disease	1:1 (though F>M after age 25)
Dermatomyositis	2:1 – 3:1
Diabetes type 1	1:1.8
Giant cell arteritis	3:1 – 4:1
Graves' disease	5:1
Hashimoto's thyroiditis	4:1 – 9:1
Multiple sclerosis	2:1 – 3:1
Myelin Oligodendrocyte Glycoprotein Antibody-Associated Disease (MOGAD)	1:1
Myasthenia gravis	3:1 (below 40 years of age)
Neuromyelitis Optica (NMOSD)	9:1
Pemphigus vulgaris	2:1
Polymyositis	2:1
Primary biliary cholangitis	9:1
Primary sclerosing cholangitis	1:2
Rheumatoid arthritis	2:1
Sjögren's disease	9:1
Systemic lupus erythematosus	9:1
Systemic sclerosis (scleroderma)	3:1 – 9:1
Takayasu's arteritis	9:1
Ulcerative colitis	1:1 (though M>F after age 45)

There are over 100 autoimmune conditions described, of which the majority are more prevalent in women than in men. Approximately 80% of all patients with autoimmune disease are women.

Autoimmune diseases which overwhelmingly affect women include those which affect the thyroid gland (Hashimoto's thyroiditis, Graves' disease), rheumatic diseases (systemic lupus erythematosus, rheumatoid arthritis, scleroderma, and Sjögren's disease), hepatobiliary diseases (primary biliary cholangitis, autoimmune hepatitis), and neurological diseases (myasthenia gravis, neuromyelitis optica spectrum disorders (NMOSD), and multiple sclerosis). For men who may develop these conditions, epidemiological and symptomological differences may still exist. For example, when multiple sclerosis and rheumatoid arthritis do occur in men, they tend to develop later in life for men (around age 30–40) than for women, when incidence rises after puberty.

Some autoimmune diseases affect both sexes at roughly equal rates, or have only a slight female predominance. These conditions include inflammatory bowel disease (ulcerative colitis, Crohn's disease), immune thrombocytopenic purpura (ITP), and MOG antibody disease, among others. Although the lifetime incidence of these diseases may be similar, there may still exist a difference in disease onset, course, complications, and prognosis, which vary based on sex. For example, men are more likely to develop Crohn's disease in the upper GI tract compared to women. Males and females are equally as likely to be affected by Crohn's disease until around age 25, when women become overrepresented as Crohn's disease patients. Women and men are equally likely to develop ulcerative colitis until age 45, after which this shifts to a significant male predominance.

Very few autoimmune diseases are thought to be more common in men than in women. Examples of these may include ankylosing spondylitis, primary sclerosing cholangitis, type 1 diabetes, and certain vasculitides including anti-GBM disease (Goodpasture syndrome) and Behçet's disease (though whether this represents an autoimmune disease vs autoinflammatory disease remains unclear.) On closer inspection, some diseases initially thought to be overrepresented in men have trended towards sex neutrality over time. For example, early studies of ankylosing spondylitis reported a ratio of 10:1 male to female patients, but more recent reports have indicated this is closer to 3:1. This may reflect a true increased incidence in women over time, or may be due to improvements in diagnostic testing.

Additionally, sex ratios of affected patients can vary widely between geographic regions. For instance, Crohn's disease is slightly more common in women in Western countries, whereas it is slightly more common in men in Asian countries. Behçet's disease is more common in males in regions along the historic Silk Road, but is more common in women in the United States. This suggests that the risks of developing autoimmune disease are multifactorial, and may vary based on race and environment as well as sex.

== Race and ethnicity ==
Racial and ethnic identities affect prevalence rates in differing autoimmune diseases. For example, lupus, a potential growth of Systemic Lupus Erythematosus and more broadly Lupus Nephritis, is more prevalent in predominately Black, but also Native American, Asian, Hispanic women, and other racial and ethnic minorities in comparison to white females.

Prevalence of lupus for Black women is highest in southern states, and in areas with lower socioeconomic status in the United States. Alongside this, Black women experience more symptomatology and complications related to lupus, including renal disease. In terms of healthcare received, specifically Black women have shown greater frequency in visits to urgent care for autoimmune disease complications, including in Myasthenia Gravis (MG). Black women with MG also develop the condition at younger ages than White women.

For Native American women, autoimmune hyperparathyroidism is more prevalent. In addition, among Caucasian women, celiac disease (or gluten intolerance) is more prevalent than in other races or genders.

== Signs and symptoms ==
Autoimmune diseases can result in systemic or localized symptoms, depending on the given disease. Typical systemic symptoms include fevers, fatigue, muscle aches, joint pain, and rashes; these can be seen in diseases such as lupus or rheumatoid arthritis. Other autoimmune diseases have localized effects on specific organs or tissue types. For instance, alopecia areata presents with patchy baldness due to autoimmune destruction of hair follicles, whereas multiple sclerosis presents with neurological symptoms due to autoimmune demyelination of the central nervous system.

Both systemic and localized disease can present with symptoms that are exclusive to women. Women with Sjögren's disease (an autoimmune disease characterized by destruction and inflammation of the salivary and lacrimal glands) are 2–3 times more likely to report vaginal dryness than other postmenopausal women.

== Causes ==
The causes of autoimmunity remain the subject of extensive research and include genetic as well as environmental factors. However, the clear overrepresentation of women as persons with autoimmune disease suggests that sex-specific factors are highly instrumental in the development of these conditions. Posited reasons for this disparity include the differential effects of sex hormones (especially estrogen) on immune response, X-chromosome inactivation, changes associated with pregnancy, and evolutionary pressures that affect the sexes differently. Due to biological development, many of these elements are inextricably linked, and it can be difficult to isolate the individual effects of each factor.

=== X chromosome inactivation ===
Many genes involved in the immune response reside on the X chromosome, of which most women have two copies, whereas men typically only have one. During cell division in embryological development, one of the two X chromosomes is inactivated at random, in a process called lyonization. This ensures that the expression of X chromosome genes is randomly suppressed on one of the two copies in females to compensate for the extra copy of these genes. Incomplete suppression of the extra copies of these genes may lead to overexpression of some genes involved in the immune response, resulting in a more robust immune response and an increased risk of developing autoimmune diseases.

Additional support for this hypothesis can be illustrated by the higher rates of autoimmune disease in men with Klinefelter syndrome (47,XXY). Like women, males with Klinefelter syndrome also have two copies of the X chromosome, which may predispose them to increased risk of autoimmune disease through the same mechanism. This risk is highest in autoimmune diseases which are female-predominant (e.g., Addison's disease, multiple sclerosis, Sjögren's disease). With the exception of Type 1 diabetes, which affects both sexes at roughly equal rates, Klinefelter syndrome was not correlated with increased risk of autoimmune diseases which occur in males with greater or equal frequency (e.g., ankylosing spondylitis, psoriasis.)

Despite having only one copy of the X chromosome, women with Turner syndrome (45,XO) are still twice as likely as the general female population to develop autoimmune diseases. Interestingly, the autoimmune diseases for which Turner syndrome patients are at greater risk include inflammatory bowel disease, type 1 diabetes, alopecia areata, and several other autoimmune disorders, which tend to affect the sexes at roughly equal rates. This suggests that the development of autoimmune disease is not solely mediated by differential expression of genes on the X chromosome.

=== Sex hormones ===
Sex hormones are instrumental in nearly every aspect of human biology, including the development and response of the adaptive immune system. Sex hormones such as estrogen, progesterone, and testosterone are all present in healthy men and women, albeit at different levels. Estrogen and progesterone are considered primary female sex hormones, while testosterone is the primary male sex hormone. Broadly speaking, estrogen is understood to be immune-activating, while testosterone is considered to be immune-suppressing. The ideal immune system response must be alert enough to recognize and destroy foreign antigens, while also being selective enough to avoid attacking the self. There exists a necessary trade-off between immune system hyperactivity (autoimmunity) versus hypoactivity (immune deficiency). Since men and women have different levels of these sex hormones, they necessarily incur unequal risk for developing these conditions. Very broadly speaking, men are more predisposed to infectious disease, but are less likely to develop autoimmune disease. Women, conversely, are at higher risk for developing autoimmune disease, but are more protected from infectious disease than men. Women have a greater number of circulating antibodies than do men, which has implications for their development of autoimmune disease, as well as their increased resistance to infectious disease.

==== Estrogen ====
Estrogen has significant effects on the response of the adaptive immune system. Higher levels of estrogen are correlated with higher levels of circulating antibodies, which are responsible for mounting an immune response. In addition to short-term changes, the immune system may also be influenced by longer-term changes, such as total lifetime exposure. The course of disease may also be related to hormonal fluctuations, especially those of puberty, pregnancy, and menopause.

==== Testosterone ====
The immunocompetence handicap hypothesis proposes that testosterone may have utility as a secondary sexual characteristic that signals fitness to prospective mates. As males have higher levels of testosterone, which suppresses immune system activity, signaling fitness despite this handicap is a demonstration of mate quality despite this handicap. Additional proof-of-concept can be demonstrated through testosterone supplementation. Men with Klinefelter syndrome (47,XXY) naturally make very little testosterone; androgen supplementation has been shown to decrease serum levels of all immunoglobulins in these men.

=== Pregnancy ===
Pregnancy has both short- and long-term effects on the immune system, and these changes may persist even after the completion of pregnancy. These effects on the course of autoimmune diseases vary widely and are dependent on the specific disease, as well as the individual patient. Conditions such as rheumatoid arthritis often improve throughout pregnancy, especially in the second and third trimesters; however, women often relapse within three months of giving birth. Other conditions, such as lupus, often become much worse throughout pregnancy.

During pregnancy, the hormone estrogen spikes; additionally, hormonal fluctuations may continue long after childbirth. These changes could trigger, improve or even worsen an autoimmune disease. In addition to estrogen, other hormones like progesterone and prolactin may trigger these illnesses.

The mother's immune system tends to be suppressed during pregnancy to prevent fetal rejection from foreign antibodies in the fetus. As stated before, pregnancy causes an increase in estrogen in the female body. The increase of this hormone weakens the functioning of immune cells, thus debilitating the mother's immune system. In addition, fetal cells may continue to circulate in the mother's body for years after childbirth, making it a possible trigger for autoimmune disease.

== Diagnosis ==
Autoantibodies with commonly-associated autoimmune diseases
Autoantibody	Condition
ANA*("anti-nuclear antibody")	Lupus
AHA ("anti-histone antibody")	Drug-induced lupus
ds-DNA ("anti-double-stranded DNA antibody")	Systemic lupus erythematosus with renal involvement
SMA ("anti-smooth muscle antibody")	Autoimmune Hepatitis
AMA ("anti-mitochondrial antibody")	Primary Biliary cholangitis
ACA ("anti-centromere antibody")	Scleroderma (CREST)
SS-A/Ro Ab ("anti-Sjögren's syndrome A"/"anti-Ro" antibody)	Sjögren's disease
CCP ("anti-cyclic citrullinated peptide")	Rheumatoid Arthritis
RF (rheumatoid factor)	Rheumatoid Arthritis
Jo ("anti-Jo antibody")	Polymyositis
anti-Scl-70 ("anti-topoisomerase I antibody")	Systemic Scleroderma

Diagnosis of autoimmune disease is based upon clinical and laboratory evidence. To diagnose autoimmune disease, typical symptoms of a given disorder must be present, along with laboratory evidence of autoantibodies. Autoantibodies develop throughout the course of autoimmune disease, as the immune system mistakenly forms specific antibodies to its own tissues, resulting in inflammation. The presence of autoantibodies alone is not sufficient for diagnosis, as autoantibodies may arise for a variety of other reasons, including malignancy, infection, or injury, and may be present even in completely healthy persons. However, it is possible for persons to have detectable autoantibody levels before clinically developing autoimmune disease; this state may be characterized as pre-autoimmunity. Additionally, it is possible to display clinical signs of autoimmune disease before autoantibody levels are detectable. Most autoantibody assays are more sensitive than they are specific; that is, a negative autoantibody test is better at excluding a given disease than a positive autoantibody test is at diagnosing a disease.

Generally, autoantibody results are reported in the form of titers, with higher titers (e.g., 1:160) indicating greater autoantibody concentration than lower titers (e.g., 1:8). Different autoantibody assays will have different criteria for determining whether a given test is positive, negative, or indeterminate. Other laboratories ordered in the workup of autoimmune disease may include a white blood cell count (WBC), CRP (C-reactive protein), ESR (erythrocyte sedimentation rate), and C3/C4 (complement levels), among others.

Additional circumstantial evidence to indicate a likely autoimmune disease includes family history and clustering of autoimmune diseases within a given family, presence of HLA haplotypes associated with a given disease, sex bias, and proof-of-concept through response to immunosuppressive therapy.

== Treatment ==
Currently, it is not possible to cure any autoimmune disease. However, treatments exist that can improve the course of a given disease and/or result in long periods of remission. Pharmacological treatment of autoimmune disease can be broadly classified into anti-inflammatory, immunosuppressive, and palliative – e.g., correcting a functional disturbance related to the condition. The overall goals of such treatment are to limit the severity of flare-ups of disease, as well as to limit the total number of flares – that is, to extend periods of disease remission.

=== Anti-inflammatory ===
Nonsteroidal anti-inflammatory drugs (NSAIDs) are commonly used to reduce inflammation associated with flares of autoimmune illness. NSAIDs work by inhibiting COX-1 and COX-2 enzymes, which are responsible for generating prostaglandins which cause inflammation. They additionally may inhibit chemotaxis, stop neutrophil aggregation, and decrease levels of pro-inflammatory cytokines. They are not considered immunosuppressive agents, as they do not directly target immune cells. Examples of NSAIDs include ibuprofen, naproxen, and diclofenac. These drugs are not recommended past the 20th week of pregnancy, as they may have adverse effects on the development of the fetal circulatory system and kidneys.

=== Corticosteroids ===
Corticosteroids also have both anti-inflammatory and immunosuppressive effects, and are used widely in the treatment of autoimmune disease. They work through promoting the synthesis of multiple proteins such as lipocortin-1 and annexin A1, which stop the downstream production of prostaglandins and leukotrienes which promote inflammation. Examples of corticosteroids used in autoimmune disease include prednisone and methylprednisolone. There are no robust randomized controlled studies in humans regarding the safety of corticosteroid use in pregnancy. Corticosteroid use may be associated with cleft palate formation in the 1st trimester, but the data on this is limited. There is little evidence to suggest that maternal corticosteroid use is associated with early delivery, low birth weight, or preeclampsia. Prednisone and methylprednisolone have been classed as pregnancy category C, in that they should only be used if the maternal benefits outweigh potential risks to the fetus.

=== Immunosuppressive ===
Optimal treatment of autoimmune disease addition to quelling the generalized inflammation which may occur with autoimmune disease, treatment is also focused on specifically targeting the adaptive immune system. The goal of direct immunosuppression is to treat flares as well as extend the period of remission between episodes. Immunosuppressive drugs are categorized into DMARDs (disease-modifying anti-rheumatic drugs), as well as

==== DMARDs (Disease-Modifying Anti-Rheumatic Drugs) ====
DMARDs can be further classified into conventional-synthetic, targeted-synthetic, and biologic agents. They aid in therapy for rheumatoid arthritis and other diseases, including psoriatic arthritis, ankylosing spondylitis, and vasculitis. Conventional DMARDs trigger broad immunosuppressive effects, while targeted and biologic agents selectively inhibit specific cytokines or cellular pathways.

=== Palliative ===
Some autoimmune diseases with targeted effects on endocrine organs can result in an inability to produce hormones necessary to maintain normal physiology. Palliative treatment of autoimmune disease involves treating the secondary condition by replacing vital hormones that are no longer being produced. Examples of this include the treatment of type-1 diabetes with exogenous insulin. Though this does not cure the primary autoimmune disease, it effectively treats the lack of hormone caused by it.

=== Non-pharmacological ===
Non-pharmacological treatments are effective in treating autoimmune disease and contribute to a sense of well-being. Women can:

- Eat healthy, well-balanced meals. A healthy diet limits saturated fat, trans fat, cholesterol, salt, and added sugars. People may alleviate symptoms of inflammation by following the Autoimmune Protocol Diet, which focuses on eliminating food that may trigger inflammation. Those with autoimmune diseases should focus on consuming foods that are very fresh and nutritious.
- Engage in regular physical activity without overdoing it. Patients should speak with a clinician about what types of physical activity are appropriate. A gradual and gentle exercise program often works well for people with long-lasting muscle and joint pain. For example, yoga or tai chi may be helpful.
- Get enough rest. Rest allows body tissues and joints the time they need to repair. Sleeping is a great way to maintain the health of the mind and body. Lack of sleep, along with elevated stress levels, may cause symptoms to worsen. Without proper rest, the body's immune defense remains inadequate. Many people need at least seven to nine hours of sleep each day to feel well-rested.
- Reduce stress. Stress and anxiety can trigger symptoms to flare up in some autoimmune diseases. Simplifying daily stressors will help alleviate symptoms and contribute to a sense of well-being. Meditation, self-hypnosis, and guided imagery may be effective in reducing stress, pain, and boosting people's ability to cope with other effects of autoimmune diseases. Instructional materials can guide people in learning these activities. Some include self-help books, audio sources, tapes, or consulting with an instructor. Joining a support group or talking with a counselor might also help manage stress and cope with the disease. As women are more likely to experience certain stressors, such as in caregiver roles, or in balancing caregiver roles with workplace roles, they may be exposed to epigenetic presentation risks; thus, looking at each women's different roles and stressors, and implementing strategies accordingly, can aid in management of disease.

=== Complementary ===
Some complementary treatments may be effective and include:

- Listening to music
- Taking time to relax in a comfortable position
- Using imagery throughout the day
- Imagining confronting the pain and watching it be destroyed.
- Journaling and daily affirmations
- Traditional herbal medicine

== During pregnancy ==
Concerns about fertility and pregnancy are present in women with autoimmune diseases. Talking with a healthcare provider before becoming pregnant is recommended. They may suggest waiting until the disease is in remission or suggest a change in medication before becoming pregnant. There are endocrinologists that specialize in treating women with high-risk pregnancies.

Some women with autoimmune diseases may have problems getting pregnant. This can happen for many reasons, such as medication types or even disease types. Tests can tell if fertility problems are caused by an autoimmune disease or an unrelated reason. Fertility treatments can help some women with autoimmune disease become pregnant.

Changes in the severity of the disease seem to vary depending on the type of disease. There is an observable trend in pregnant women with rheumatoid arthritis, where the condition seems to improve during pregnancy. Differently, expecting mothers with systemic lupus erythematosus (SLE) may be more likely to have worsened symptoms through pregnancy; however, this is difficult to predict.

Certain medications can hinder women's ability to get pregnant, such as cyclophosphamide or corticosteroids. For this reason, it may be helpful for women with autoimmune diseases to seek treatment when conceiving.

== Discrimination and disparities ==
=== Race and ethnicity ===
Varying forms of discrimination have been reported by women with autoimmune diseases of differing races and ethnicities. Black women diagnosed with lupus, when in healthcare settings, have reported the following conditions when interacting with healthcare providers: low compassion, low respect, racial discrimination, ethnic discrimination, hurried communication, distracted discrimination, as well as fears around being stereotyped, and not included in medical decisions. In a similar survey, fears around being given poor medical care, being exploited in research, and losing legal status were recorded by Hispanic and Latinx men and women with multiple sclerosis. Women of color with autoimmune disease also report more interactions with providers around dismissal of symptoms, and general mistrust of those in medical settings as well as its systems.

Health outcomes can be impacted by the intersection of race, gender, and autoimmune diseases. Studies on women of color found heightened autoimmune disease activity after experiencing discrimination from healthcare providers. For example, racial discrimination correlates with greater lupus complications and organ damage in Black women with lupus.

In the area of treatment, factors related to race and ethnicity can also be noted. Competent medical care is able to account for the population at hand and recognize treatment factors that may be beneficial to the individual. This may include staying current on diverse research, receiving training on awareness and reduction of discrimination, and building sensitivity to cultures. This may include the mentioned and recorded fears, and also factors important to patients. For example, Caribbean black women diagnosed with multiple sclerosis are more likely to use faith in their treatments and diagnosis than the general population.

=== Research gaps ===
In autoimmune disease research, there exist gaps in gender, race, ethnicities, and the intersectionality of all three. Historically, areas of research, including for medical conditions, have found their sample sizes with white males. In 2022, only 32 of 2305 federal funded research titles included the words "Sex, gender, female, maternal, or variations of women, pregnancy, or lactating", though women are disproportionately affected and diagnosed with autoimmune diseases. In 2024, a new race category that separated Arab individuals from Caucasians was added in federal research. Arabs have been shown to have higher rates of autoantibodies prevalent in autoimmune diseases, yet due to this only recent separation in categories, Arab individuals with autoimmune diseases lack research. In all, more gender focused research can be conducted and combined with race and ethnicity data to produce further research in identifying prevalences, gaps, treatment, and diagnosis, for women across a spectrum.

=== Workplace ===
The impact of workplace burden, stigma, discrimination have been studied in workplaces across various autoimmune diseases. Higher burden has been recorded in autoimmune conditions such as irritable bowel disease Inflammatory bowel disease (IBD), which includes higher burdens in the workplace due to needing more sick leave, disability support, and in some cases periods (such as with flair ups) of unemployment. Women autoimmune diseases also face similar burdens such anxiety, depression, or disability, which even if temporary, can occur and limit working capacity and increase cognitive impairment, pain, fatigue, illness.

Stigma can compound the stress of an autoimmune disease, and can be more pronounced when disability is more evident, and when the disease is more progressive. Fear of stigmatization, as a factor of stigma, can impact multiple factors in a workers life. These ways include preventing them from requesting accommodations, limiting them from bringing accommodations to work, fearing coworkers negative perspectives, shifting their beliefs to thinking employers will choose other candidates for a position, and even installing ideas that they may be fired for their condition. In all, fear of stigmatization has been seen to limit those with autoimmune diseases from seeking work, disclosing conditions, and have led to those with conditions to leave work positions in anticipatory fear.

Improving workplace perceptions can improve conditions for those with autoimmune diseases. For some examples, stigma reducing workplace interventions, improved education about conditions, positive behaviors from coworkers and leaders, legal protections, and safety around trusting employees, can improve a workers feelings of safety and acceptance in the workplace. As many autoimmune conditions can be termed an "invisible illness", and have varied and fluctuating presentations impacting workers in different ways, increasing awareness about conditions and the physical and mental toll they take, not just visually, can improve employer and coworker perceptions.

=== Healthcare coverage and settings ===
From a financial perspective, women with autoimmune diseases differ from men. Compared to men, data shows out of pocket costs for healthcare are reported to be 15 billion dollars more women, employee sponsored insurance cover over a billion dollars less for women, and when insured over 30% of women reported healthcare aid to be insufficient for medical costs. Not having insurance and/or low income can create barriers receiving treatments, and in turn create long term consequences including impacting daily quality of life for women.

In healthcare settings, 41% of rheumatologists are women and under 10% are a racial minority, creating contrast to the 80% of the female population treated by the specialty. It may take women who are diagnosed with autoimmune disorders years and multiple doctors to be diagnosed, which can be impacted by the nature of each individual autoimmune disease and provider interactions. Improved provider care interactions include listening and prior education when treating women to look for signs and symptoms. Education may allow providers to relate to their patients and hold awareness of the unique challenges patients face in gender, race, ethnicity, and disability. This can improve treatment outcomes, progression, and feelings of comfort and safety.

== Accommodations ==
=== Workplace accommodations ===
Autoimmune diseases, due to their ability to alter quality of life including day to day tasks- such as in the workplace- can require accommodations. Accommodations, though, are diverse in the same way presentations of autoimmune diseases are diverse. In the workplace, accommodations can include a spectrum from policies for invisible illnesses to mobility devices for progressive illnesses.

A list of possible accommodations in workplaces include:

- Telecommuting options.
- Flexible hours, starting times, and amount of workdays.
- Breaks when needed, such as in the case of IBD.
- Temperature and light control, such as for Lupus.
- Modifying tasks during flare ups, such as reducing repetitive movements in joint based autoimmune conditions.
- Pregnancy and childbirth accommodations which may trigger flare ups in conditions such as Lupus.
- Working with a vocational rehabilitation counselor.

=== Home and caregiver accommodations ===
Women with autoimmune diseases can be of reproductive age, and in turn have children, or plan to have children, before or after diagnosis. There is need, then, to address accommodations throughout a caregivers life and in their main home environment. Some common concerns among caregivers is the impact of flare-ups from their condition, or physical disability. These can result in fatigue, mobility complications, pain, frustration among other psychological concerns such as loss of autonomy, and difficulties in tasks around the house and in their children's lives.

A list of possible accommodations in homes and childcare include:

- Working with an occupational therapist in the home and/or in therapeutic setting: Occupational therapists can help create strategies of success during chronic flare-ups, such as delegating tasks, explaining conditions to children, alternative mobility options, and more.
- Utilizing community resources, such as child care, or interactions with other families.
- Close contact with rheumatologists during pregnancy, and later life: about a third of women with autoimmune diseases are taking medications that can be harmful to babies in the womb, or during breastfeeding, so support around education of medications and differing treatment during pregnancy may be needed. Alongside this, as diseases progress symptoms can be managed and adjusted to improve life quality.
- Community based learning: contact with fellow women or mothers managing autoimmune diseases increases education on strategies and promotes learning.
- Counseling has been shown to improve outcomes such as beliefs around competencies in motherhood, and similar caretaker mindsets.
- Overall, using a multi-disciplinary care team including but not limited to: counseling, rheumatology, healthcare home visits, and gynecology, can address multiple areas of health concerns.
