= Harrington–Hollingsworth experiment =

Experiment that related autoimmunity and immune thrombocytopenic purpura (ITP)

The Harrington–Hollingsworth experiment was an experiment that established the autoimmune nature of the blood disorder immune thrombocytopenic purpura. It was performed in 1950 by the academic staff of Barnes-Jewish Hospital in St. Louis, Missouri.

== Experiment ==
The experiment was undertaken in 1950 by William J. Harrington and James W. Hollingsworth, who postulated that in patients with idiopathic thrombocytopenic purpura (ITP), it was a blood factor that caused the destruction of platelets. To test this hypothesis, Harrington received 500 ml of blood from a patient with ITP. Within three hours, his platelets dropped to dangerously low levels and he experienced a seizure. His platelet count remained extremely low for four days, finally returning to normal levels by the fifth day. Bone marrow biopsy from Harrington's sternum demonstrated normal megakaryocytes, the cells necessary for platelet production.

Subsequently the experiment was repeated on all suitable staff members at the Barnes-Jewish Hospital. All subjects developed low platelet counts within three hours, and all recovered after a period of several days.

== Implications ==
Schwartz notes that the Harrington–Hollingsworth experiment was a turning point in the understanding of ITP's pathophysiology:

The Harrington–Hollingsworth experiment changed the meaning of the "I" in ITP from idiopathic to immune, but "immune" in this case means "autoimmune," because the antibodies bind to and cause the destruction of the patient's own platelets.

The experiment was the first to demonstrate that infusion of an ITP patient's plasma into a normal patient caused a precipitous drop in platelet count. This suggested that low platelet counts (thrombocytopenia) in patients with ITP was caused by a circulating factor found in the blood. Many studies performed since then have demonstrated that this circulating factor is in fact a collection of immunoglobulins. Many physician-scientists believe the findings had a major influence on the field of autoimmunity, which was not universally accepted at the time as a mechanism of human disease.
