= Gestational thrombocytopenia =

- Specialty: Obstetrics Hematology

Gestational (incidental) thrombocytopenia is a condition that commonly affects pregnant women. Thrombocytopenia is defined as the drop in platelet count from the normal range of 150,000–400,000/μL to a count lower than 150,000/μL. There is still ongoing research to determine the reason for the lowering of platelet count in women with a normal pregnancy. Some researchers speculate the cause to be dependent on dilution, decreased production of platelets, or an increased turnover event. Although women with normal pregnancy experience a low platelet count, women experiencing a continuous drop in platelet will be diagnosed with thrombocytopenia and women with levels greater than 70,000/μL will be diagnosed with gestational thrombocytopenia.

Thrombocytopenia affects approximately 7–10% of pregnant women and of the 7–10%, within that population; approximately 70–80% have gestational thrombocytopenia

Gestational thrombocytopenia is a disorder similar to immune thrombocytopenia (ITP) and is difficult to differentiate between the two disorders. Therefore, a medical history is conducted to because a diagnostic test is unavailable.

== Signs and symptoms ==
Although there are no alarming symptoms related to gestational thrombocytopenia, an individual with thrombocytopenia might show the following symptoms –

- Nose bleeds
- Gums bleeding
- Blood in urine/stool
- Easily bruised
- Enlarged spleen
- Jaundice
- Continuous bleeding due to cuts
- Rash-like spots (petechiae), mainly on the lower legs

== Causes ==
It is evident that there is a decrease in platelet count during pregnancy; however, the cause of the decrease is unknown. However researchers theorize that the decrease in platelet count is due to the decreased production of platelets and/or increased destruction of platelets.

== Mechanism ==
Generally, there is a decrease in platelet count in pregnant women and it will be due to many reasons. The two main causes of thrombocytopenia are a decrease in the production of platelets in the bone marrow and an increase in the destruction of the platelets. Platelets, along with other components of the blood, are produced in the spongy tissue found in the bone, known as bone marrow. Low platelet count maybe due to the decreased production of platelets in the bone marrow. A decreased production would be due to vitamin B12 deficiency, iron deficiency, aplastic anemia, viral infections, chemotherapy, alcohol consumption, leukemia, myelodysplasia, and cirrhosis. During pregnancy, the fetus’ waste products diffuse into the mother’s sinuses (blood stream), and cause the mother's spleen to become overactive and enlarged. Normally, the spleen filters and removes the waste products and with the overload of unwanted substances in the bloodstream, the spleen will remove blood cells too quickly or store the platelets. In both cases, the overactive spleen would cause a decrease in the circulation of the platelets.

== Diagnosis ==
Gestational thrombocytopenia will become evident during the mid-second trimester through the third trimester of pregnancy and it is diagnosed based on exclusion. For example, women with a history of immune thrombocytopenia or thrombocytopenia, prior to pregnancy, will not be diagnosed with gestational thrombocytopenia.

Patients with low platelet counts, lower than 70,000/μL, will be difficult to diagnose because low platelet counts maybe due to gestational thrombocytopenia or immune thrombocytopenia. In such cases, a treatment of immune thrombocytopenia therapy (corticosteroids, or intravenous immunoglobulin) will be instructed. If there is an improvement in the platelet levels, the patient will be diagnosed with immune thrombocytopenia, and if not the patient will be diagnosed with severe gestational thrombocytopenia

In order for the physician to determine the underlying cause of the gestational thrombocytopenia, the following tests are conducted:

=== Blood test ===
During routine prenatal checkups, the physician will conduct a complete blood count test to determine the components of blood. The complete blood count will provide further information about platelet levels.

=== Ultrasound ===
The physician may conduct an ultrasound around the spleen to determine if the spleen is enlarged.

=== Bone marrow aspiration or biopsy ===
The physician may conduct a bone marrow aspiration or bone marrow biopsy, if there is a decreased production of platelets in the bone marrow. A bone marrow aspiration and bone marrow biopsy may be conducted at the same time.

== Prevention ==
There is no known information regarding the prevention of this disorder. There is no known information regarding the group of women who are likely to be diagnosed with this disorder.

== Treatment ==
Women, diagnosed with gestational thrombocytopenia, will have their complete blood test conducted during each pre-natal visit and monitored by the doctor. Having diagnosed gestational thrombocytopenia, women should continue their normal activities because the diagnosis does not change the management of pregnancy. Also, the diagnosis of gestational thrombocytopenia poses no harm or risk to the mother or the fetus. There are no diagnostic tests available for gestational thrombocytopenia; rather it is diagnosed based on exclusion. Women who have a history of immune thrombocytopenia or thrombocytopenia prior to becoming pregnant would not be diagnosed with gestational thrombocytopenia

Women who have platelet levels lower than 70,000 / μL, during pregnancy, maybe experiencing severe gestational thrombocytopenia or immune thrombocytopenia. In such cases, if the treatment of immune thrombocytopenia therapy (corticosteroids, or intravenous immunoglobulin) does not improve the platelet count, the patient will be diagnosed with severe gestational thrombocytopenia. Severe gestational thrombocytopenia may pose a risk for complications with the use of epidural or general anesthesia during delivery.

== Prognosis ==
Those who have no previous history of thrombocytopenia, besides the occurrence in previous pregnancies (gestational thrombocytopenia), the platelet levels will go back to a normal range 1–2 months after the delivery. Post delivery, approximately 1–3 months later, women with gestational thrombocytopenia should have a complete blood test conducted. Lastly, gestational thrombocytopenia is a disorder that may reoccur in future pregnancies

== History ==
A history of this disorder has not yet been established.
