= Paul Kaznelson =

Czech scientist (1898–1959)

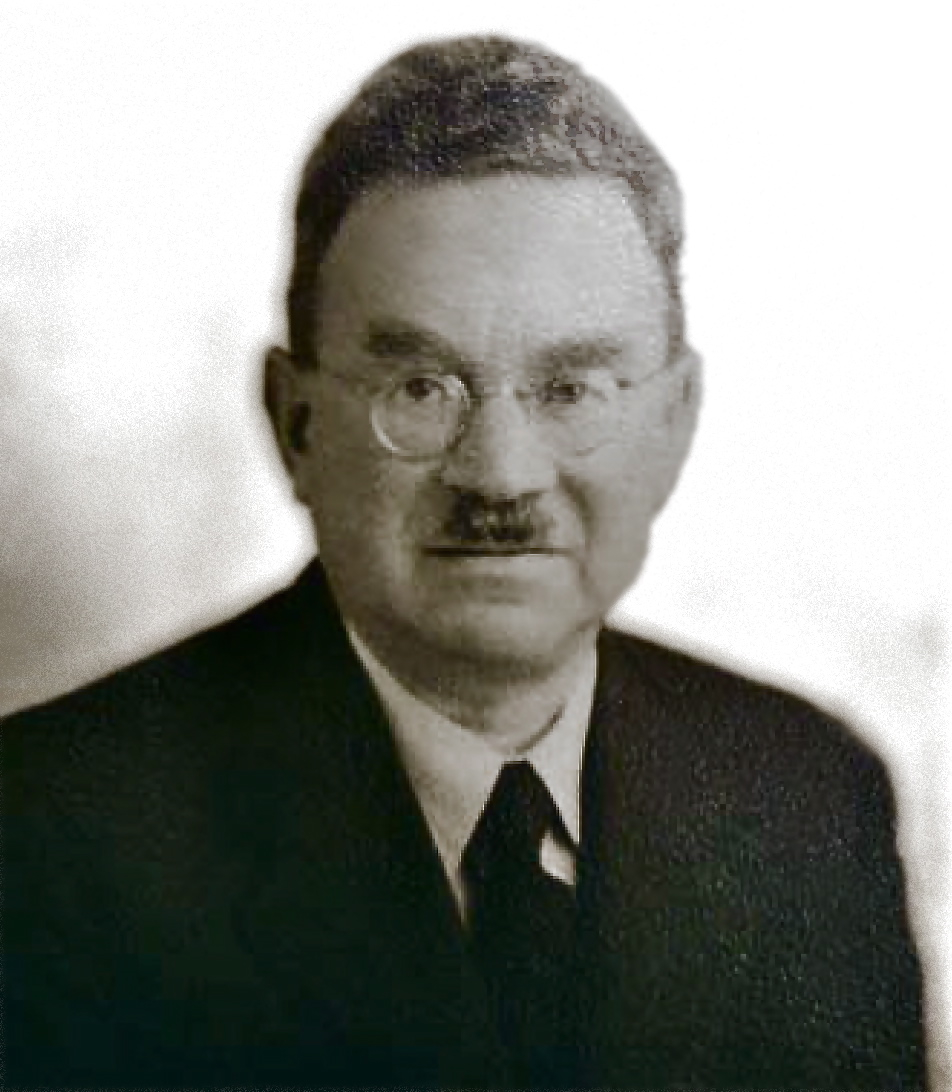
- Paul Kaznelson (1950)
- Born: 7 April 1898; Warsaw, Poland
- Died: 1959 (aged 60–61); Germany
- Citizenship: Russian and Czech
- Education: German Charles University, Prague
- Known for: Pure red cell aplasia Splenectomy for idiopathic thrombocytopenic purpura
- Scientific career
- Fields: Hematology
- Workplaces: German Charles University, Prague

Paul Kaznelson (1898–1959) was a Polish-born Czech scientist credited with describing the first case of pure red cell aplasia. He is also known for his contribution to the discovery of the therapeutic role of splenectomy in idiopathic thrombocytopenic purpura.

Much of his academic work appeared in the 1920s and 1930s, when he used to work at the Charles University in Prague.

== See also ==
- Hermann Schloffer

== Sources ==
- Ludmila Hlaváčková – Petr Svobodný, Biographisches Lexikon der Deutschen medizinischen Fakultät in Prag 1883–1945, Prague: Karolinum publishing house, 1998, p. 107. ISBN 80-7184-521-3.
