= Onyalai =

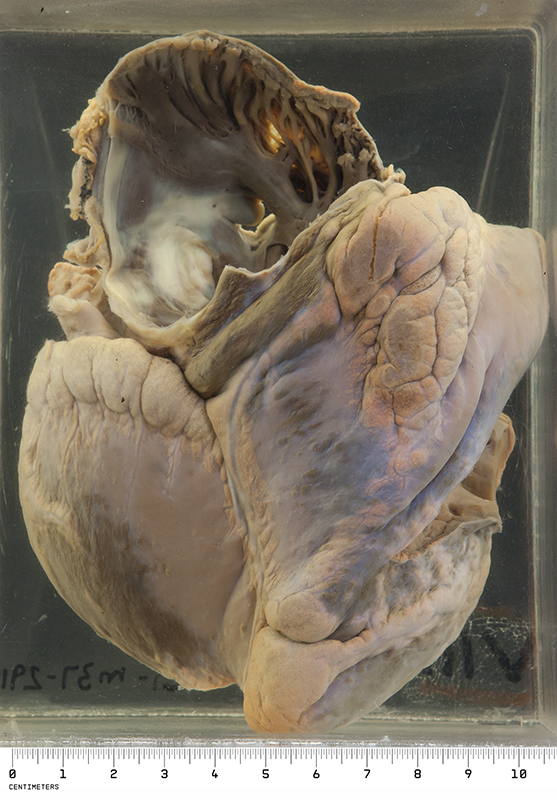
- Autopsy specimen of the heart of an individual with Onyalai. Heart shows haemorrhages throughout, particularly in the right atrium, which has been opened to reveal its interior surface.
- Specialty: Hematology

Onyalai (Pronunciation: ō′nē-al′ā-ē) is a form of thrombocytopenia that affects some of the population in areas of central Africa. Onyalai exhibits similarities to idiopathic thrombocytopenic purpura (ITP) but differs in pathogenesis. The affected age range is from less than a year to 70 years and seems to not be gender-specific in the same manner as ITP. Cases generally peak between 11 and 20 years old. Although the cause of onyalai is not known at this time, inadequate nutrition and/or the consumption of tainted food are suspected.

== Signs and symptoms ==
Onyalai is an acute disease that results in the development of hematoma on oral mucous membranes. Hemorrhagic lesions may develop on the skin, including on the soles of the feet. The patient does not initially appear to be in distress, which may result in a delay of diagnosis. As the disease progresses, hematuria and melena will develop. Epistaxis, petechiae and ecchymoses are common symptoms, as are subconjunctival bleeding and menorrhagia. On average, bleeding will persist for approximately eight days, and may reoccur. Approximately 80 percent of cases will exhibit chronic thrombocytopenia. Periodic episodes of acute hemorrhage are also possible and may be severe, possibly leading to shock and death.
