= Ianalumab =

Monoclonal antibody

Monoclonal antibody
- Type: ?
- Source: Human
- Target: BAFF receptor

Clinical data
- Other names: VAY736
- ATC code: None

Identifiers
- CAS Number: 1929549-92-7
- DrugBank: DB16666
- UNII: ZN2GQ3II96
- KEGG: D12151

Ianalumab (INN; development code VAY736) is a monoclonal antibody that is being investigated for autoimmune hepatitis, multiple sclerosis, pemphigus vulgaris, rheumatoid arthritis, Sjogren's disease, Immune thrombocytopenic purpura and systemic lupus erythematosus.

This drug is being developed by Novartis. In 2021 ianalumab was undergoing Phase II/III trials. In June 2023 ianalumab was involved in 22 clinical trials, of which 3 were completed, 14 were ongoing, 1 was planned, and 4 were terminated. It was designated as an FDA breakthrough therapy for Sjogren's disease in January 2026.
