= Epigenetics of autoimmune disorders =

Gene regulation in autoimmune diseases

Epigenetics of autoimmune disorders is the role that epigenetics (heritable changes that do not involve alterations in DNA sequences) play in autoimmune diseases. Autoimmune disorders are a diverse class of diseases that share a common origin. These diseases originate when the immune system becomes dysregulated and mistakenly attacks healthy tissue rather than foreign invaders. These diseases are classified as either local or systemic based upon whether they affect a single body system or if they cause systemic damage.

Whether someone develops an autoimmune disorder is dependent on genetics as well as environmental factors. Some families show genetic predisposition for these conditions, however genetics alone is often not sufficient to explain whether someone will develop an autoimmune condition. Smoking, stress, and diet can produce epigenetic modifications to the genome that alter the regulation of immune system-specific genes leading to the onset of these conditions.

The main mechanisms of epigenetic alterations are DNA methylation, histone modifications, and regulation by non-coding RNAs. These epigenetic changes regulate the expression of genes, including those involved in the immune system, and therefore these modifications play a role in the onset and symptoms of different systemic and local autoimmune diseases.

== Epigenetic mechanisms ==
=== DNA methylation ===
DNA methylation is an epigenetic modification that interferes with transcription and causes decreased levels of gene expression. The addition of methyl groups to DNA nucleotides inhibits transcription by creating a surface that transcription factors are unable to bind. Additionally, DNA methylation recruits methyl-CpG-binding domain proteins that signal for the formation of co-repressor complexes that alter chromatin structure and further inhibit transcription. A hypermethylated DNA state is associated with gene silencing while a hypomethylated DNA state is associated with increased levels of transcription and gene expression. DNA methylation is carried out by DNA methyltransferases (DNMTs) which attach methyl groups at the 5th position of a cytosine nucleotide. In vertebrates, gene expression is modulated in particular by methylation within a region of the genome known as a CpG island, a region near a gene's promoter that contains a high percentage of cytosine and guanine nucleotides. DNA demethylation is carried out by ten-eleven translocation (TET) enzymes which convert 5-methylcytosine (5mC) into hydroxymethylcytosine (5hmC), leading to the demethylation of that segment of DNA and an increase in gene expression. TET inhibitors have been identified as potential treatments for autoimmune diseases, particularly rheumatic ones.

=== Histone modification ===
Histone modification, resulting in conformational changes to protein binding sites, is involved in autoimmune disorders. Histone acetylation leads to increased transcription by promoting gene expression. Primarily, histone acetylation increases gene expression by reducing cross-linking between neighboring nucleosomes. Preventing this interaction between adjacent nucleosomes serves as a key driver of condensation. Additionally, histone acetylation also interferes with the electrostatic interaction between positively charged histones and negatively charged DNA by neutralizing some of the positive charges on the histone tails. This helps further promote gene expression by causing the histones to relax their grip on the DNA. Although acetylation helps to make DNA more accessible for transcription, histone acetylation's ability to make chromatin remodeling more likely to occur is an extremely important part in its ability to alter gene expression. This remodeling allows condensed heterochromatin to transform into a more relaxed euchromatin which is associated with higher levels of gene transcription.

Acetylation also functions as a way of recruiting transcription factors that promote gene expression. One way this recruitment occurs is through the activity of TAF1 (TATA-box binding protein associated factor 1) which contains a double bromodomain and can detect very low levels of histone acetylation. TAF1 detects acetylation and then recruits transcription factors to the acetylated region. Acetylation frequently occurs near promoter regions and is recognized by TAF1 which tethers TFIID to this region in order to increase the likelihood of TFIID locating the core promoter and initiating transcription. TAF1 also behaves as a HAT (histone acetyltransferase) and acetylates nearby histones at an increased frequency. Acetylation also prevents the addition of repressive marks to the DNA.

Normally, histone deacetylases (HDACs) serve to remove acetyl groups from the lysine residue of the histone causing a decrease in gene expression. HDAC activity is involved in the pathology of autoimmune diseases, such as in rheumatoid arthritis where HDAC activity is low in the synovial tissues. Histone methylation is also implicated in autoimmune disorders. This can be by inhibition of histone methylation such as in systemic sclerosis or by elevated histone methylation at certain gene loci in Type I diabetes.

Histone modification can give rise to rheumatic, endocrinological, and gastrointestinal autoimmune disorders. Histone modification leads to either activation or repression of gene expression depending on the disorder. Suberanilohydroxamic acid (SAHA), also known as Vorinostat, inhibits the activity of HDACs. Vorinostat has shown promise as a treatment for immune system dysfunctions. Vorinostat, by inhibiting HDACs, can treat cutaneous T cell lymphoma. Though epigenetics-based treatments for autoimmune rheumatic disorders does not exist yet, Vorinostat's function in treating T cell lymphoma is a basis for a path to epigenetics-based treatment of autoimmune rheumatic disorders.

=== Non-coding RNAs ===
==== Micro-RNAs (miRNAs) ====
Micro-RNAs (miRNAs) are small RNA fragments, 18–23 nucleotides in length, that act to regulate gene expression post-transcriptionally. miRNAs play a critical role in modulating the immune response since they influence whether or not the mRNA transcribed from specific immune related genes will go on to be translated into protein or not. Alteration of different miRNA levels is associated with autoimmune disease pathogenesis and symptoms. Depending on the disorder, upregulation or downregulation of a specific type of miRNA may be observed. miRNAs negatively regulate gene expression by binding to complementary mRNA sequences within the 3' untranslated region (3' UTR). This process of miRNA activity begins with the synthesis of pri-miRNA in the nucleus by RNA polymerase II which is then converted into pre-miRNA. This pre-miRNA exits the nucleus and is cut by Dicer into a double stranded RNA with one of the strands binding to the RISC complex. This binding leads to the association of the miRNA with its target mRNA sequence and encourages the degradation of the mRNA or represses translation of the mRNA, decreasing gene expression. miRNA can also affect gene expression via the binding of RNA-induced transcriptional silencing (RITS) complex. The binding of the RITS complex to miRNA allows for post-transcriptional histone modifications such as methylation to be made further altering gene expression.

==== Long non-coding RNAs (lncRNAs) ====
Long non-coding RNAs have also been identified as playing an important role in gene expression. These lncRNAs are RNAs that are more than 200 nucleotides in length but are not transcribed into any functional protein. They have been identified to play a role in the epigenetics of diseases such as discoid lupus erythematosus and rheumatoid arthritis. One method by which lncRNAs regulate gene expression is through the process of X inactivation which functions as a way to provide dosage compensation. In X-inactivation, Xist (X-inactive specific transcript) lncRNA is transcribed and coats the Xi chromosome that will be inactivated, beginning the process of chromosome condensation and repression of genes on that X chromosome. Still, more research is needed to further understand the mechanisms these lncRNAs use in order to regulate gene expression.

== Systemic autoimmune diseases ==
Systemic autoimmune diseases are those that effect multiple organ systems rather than targeting a single type of tissue or organ system.

=== Rheumatoid arthritis (RA) ===
Rheumatoid arthritis is a degenerative autoimmune disease that causes damage and inflammation to a patient's joint and can affect bodily systems involving the heart, lungs, nerves, eyes, bones, and skin. Global DNA hypomethylation is a hallmark of Rheumatoid Arthritis and is observed in the early stages of this disease, when joint degeneration begins. Those who suffer from RA have a global decreased level of methylation on many DNA promoter regions including those associated with normal immune system and joint function. This overexpression from hypomethylation is observed in various genes such as ITGAL, CD40LG, PRF1, and more. Taking a closer glance at those who suffer from RA, it can be observed that within the synovial cells, there is a level of hypomethylation which is proposed to cause the expression and overproduction of the cytokines which perpetuate the inflammatory response causing inflammation within the synovial fluid, which is the fluid that exists between the joints. Typically, healthy joints have a thin layer of synovial tissue that lines the cavities of the joints. However, as an increase number of immune cells begins to penetrate the tissue, the synovial tissue begins to form a thick lining layer that consists of different macrophages and synovial cells. Hypomethylation of CD40LG, which will make the T-cells within the immune response, can lead to T-cell overexpression and becomes a contributing factor to how Rheumatoid Arthritis functions within an inflammatory response. Patients with RA often display anti-cyclic citrullinated peptide (anti-CCP) antibodies and have hypomethylation of the retrotransposon gene L1, as well as decreased methylation at the Il6 and ERa promoter. TET proteins, more specifically the TET1-TET3 enzymes and TET2 in T cells can demethylate DNA which helps to set and clarify the early stages of RA. The RA development from demethylation of histones in the patient can lead to expression of high levels of IL-6 which causes destruction in the joints. miRNAs also play an important part in rheumatoid arthritis development as well, particularly the upregulation of miRNA-146a and miRNA-150. Although more research is needed, lncRNAs have been implicated to play a role in this disease since current treatments used for this disorder show altered expression of 85 different lncRNAs in RA patients on tocilizumab and adalimumab.

As a systemic disease, RA can develop other complications and cause damage to tissues and organs besides the joints, which include the heart, lungs, bones, skin, and eyes. In regard to the heart, RA patients typically experience some form of heart disease such as pericarditis, myocarditis, and coronary artery disease. Because the synovial tissue and circulating immune cells release pro-inflammatory cytokines (TNF-α and IL-6), this leads to systemic inflammation and the overexpression of T-cell and B-cell lymphocytes. Autoantibodies, antibodies that react with self-antigens, in RA then affect the structures of the cardiovascular system, such as the myocardium and heart valves, thus leading to various forms of cardiovascular disease. Osteoporosis is another common systemic disease that can occur along with RA. Systematic inflammation, autoantibody circulation in the body, and the secretion of pro-inflammatory cytokines work together to contribute to the bone erosion and fragility in RA patients. The inflammatory cytokines decrease osteoblastogenesis while promoting osteoclastogenesis, which is why bone loss is more likely to occur, especially around the joints of those who suffer from RA. Osteoblastogenesis refers to the process by which osteoblasts, the cells responsible for bone formation, are generated and differentiated to develop and maintain the bone. Meanwhile, osteoclasts, cells involved with the dissolution and reabsorption of old bone tissue, are involved in the process of osteoclastogenesis.

There are several environmental risks factors that also contribute to the development of rheumatoid arthritis through epigenetic modifications induced by external stimuli, which include smoking and air pollution. The main source of air pollution has come from heavy traffic, fuel burners, forest fires, and solid fuel combustion, which usually contain a mixture of particles and gases such as nitrate, sulfur dioxide, ozone, and carbon monoxide. These pollutants can release reactive oxygen species that can be easily inhaled into the respiratory tract to activate nuclear factor ƙappa B (NF-ƙB), an important regulator for pro-inflammatory cytokine production in RA. This process leads to an excess production of T helper lymphocyte type 1 (Th1) cytokines that migrate to tissues in the synovial joints, further promoting inflammation. In addition, smoking has been found to be one of the most common environmental risk factor for developing RA as it affects the lung tissue and alters the expression of sirtuins (SIRT) in the body. SIRT is a deacetylase protein that is involved in modifying histone and non-histone proteins, and it is essential for the body's ability to adapt as it helps to maintain the stability of the genome when cells are using epigenetic mechanisms to respond to stress. Other general risk factors for rheumatoid arthritis include sex, age, family history, and excess weight. Women are more likely to develop RA compared to men, and RA typically begins developing in middle-aged adults.

Because rheumatoid arthritis is caused by certain epigenetic mechanisms involved in regulating biological processes, these epigenetic alterations have been found to be reversible and could be altered by diet, drugs, and other environmental factors. For example, inhibition of the histone deacetylase HDAC6i can ameliorate collagen type II - induced arthritis. This suggests that prevention and therapy of diseases that target the epigenetic mechanisms could help to treat chronic inflammatory diseases. Efforts have been made to create drugs that either change or restore the original epigenetic mechanisms that occur within the body, and some DNA methyltransferase inhibitors have already been used to treat inflammatory conditions such as pancreatitis. However, more clinical trials and testing still needs to be done before these drugs can be approved.

=== Systemic lupus erythematosus (SLE) ===
Systemic lupus erythematosus is the most common form of lupus and is a condition in which the immune system attacks healthy bodily tissue causing widespread inflammation and tissue damage across many organ systems. Hypomethylation is observed across the epigenome in those with systemic lupus. The promoter regions of many genes including ITGAL, CD40LG, and CD70 are shown to be hypomethylated as well as the 18S and 28S ribosomal gene promoters. In particular, this DNA hypomethylation is thought to alter the chromatin structure of T cells enhancing the immune and inflammatory response observed in those with this condition. Genome wide it has been shown that when comparing the epigenomes of pairs of identical twins in which one twin is afflicted by the condition and one is not, the twin possessing the condition shows global decreases in methylation of their genomes. This hypomethylation causes genes that are traditionally repressed by methylation to be overexpressed particularly in CD4+ T cells. It has been suggested that inhibition of DNMT1 produces the loss of methylation observed in those afflicted by systemic lupus. DNMT1 is a DNA methyltransferase that maintains methylation patterns across the process of DNA replication, ensuring that new copies of DNA contain the methylation pattern observed on the original parent strand. Inhibition of DNMT1 causes methylation patterns to be lost across generations and epigenome-wide hypomethylation is observed as a result. In particular, it has been observed that DNMT1 expression is lower in immune T-cells. Levels of DNMT1 is partly regulated by the ERK signaling pathway in the body. In patients with SLE, ERK activity has been found to be reduced in lupus CD4+ T-cells. When ERK activity is suppressed, it causes there to be a reduction in DNMT1 expression and DNA hypomethylation levels increases. Because of this, the DNA of CD4+ T-cells in SLE patients becomes hypomethylated, which causes them to be autoreactive when encountering self-class MHC II molecules. Because it is a systematic disease, SLE can also affect many other body systems including the kidneys, brain, central nervous system, blood system, lungs, and heart. There is no cure for SLE but treatments aim to control inflammation, alleviate pain and damage to the joints, prevent disease flares, and minimize organ damage.

Several environmental factors such as smoking, viral infections, various chemicals, and UV light, have been found to induce oxidative stress that leads to inhibition or reduction of DNMT1 levels, which reduces DNA methylation in CD4+ T-cells and can prompt autoimmunity. In patients with SLE, the disease can be triggered or induced by exposure to UV light with its effects appearing to be dose dependent. UV-B light can induce apoptosis of dermal cells, and this can release large amounts of autoantigens and pro-inflammatory cytokines, which can trigger systematic inflammation. Additionally, vitamin D has been found to have a role in SLE activity. Vitamin D has a protective role in regulating the immune system and possibly in the regulation of gene expression important for SLE pathogenesis. Deficiency of vitamin D has also been shown to be associated with higher lupus disease activity as there seems to be a decrease in the proliferation and production of the IgG immunoglobulin. Although there is no clear association, smoking and drinking have also been reported as potential environmental risk factors for SLE.

=== Systemic sclerosis (SSc) ===
Systemic sclerosis (SSc) is an autoimmune disease characterized by system wide excessive collagen deposits. It can affect several bodily systems including the skin, internal organs, lungs, heart, kidneys, musculoskeletal system, and the gastrointestinal tract. It causes the patient's skin and connective tissues to tighten and harden due to the uncontrolled accumulation of extracellular matrix proteins on the joints and various internal organ system which can lead to premature death in patients. Fli1 is a transcription factor that negatively regulates collagen production such that the higher the Fli gene expression, the less collagen is produced. In SSc patients, hypermethylation of CpG islands in the Fli1 promoter region is observed, inhibiting transcription of the Fli gene and increasing collagen production beyond normal levels causing collagen build-up and an overproduction of fibrous connective tissue. This causes joint damage, scarring, and thickening of the skin. Patients with SSc are also observed to have decreased levels of DNA methyltransferases (DNMTs) in their CD4+ T cells which play an important role in the immune system. This reduced methylation is associated with immune dysfunction and the progression of SSc and its inflammatory effects, however more research is needed to further understand this implication. Patients with systemic sclerosis also display hypomethylation of the collagen genes COL23A1 and COL4A2. This overexpression of these collagen genes leads an overproduction of collagen characteristic to tissue fibrosis. The TGF-β signaling pathway and Wnt/β-catenin signaling pathway also play an important role in this disease. The TGF-β signaling pathway is responsible for several cellular responses from cell differentiation and migration in developing cells to regulating homeostasis within an immune response in the body. The TGF-β signaling pathway is involved in that activation of fibroblast which precedes fibrosis. The gene, ITGA9 which codes for alpha integrin 9 and is involved in this pathway, is hypomethylated in those with this condition leading to overexpression of integrins which leads to fibrosis as wells as provides positive feedback to this pathway further encouraging fibroblast activation. An Integrin is a type of receptor that is a transmembrane receptor meaning it is able to communicate from cell to cell and help the cell attach and adhere to nearby cells.

There are several different types of environmental risk factors that can affect autoimmune diseases. Frequency exposure to crystalline silica dust has been recognized as a risk factor for SSc. SSc patients with occupational exposure to silica has been shown to be a factor in the pathogenesis of the disease. Additionally, organic solvent exposure has been found to be a risk factor for the disease, although the specific agents involved have not been identified.

Because epigenetics has been recognized as a contributor to SSc pathogenesis, epi-drugs have been tested as potential therapeutics for the disease. Drugs targeting certain miRNAs in SSc to replace or inhibit them have been found to reduce some fibrosis effects. However, several issues including inconsistent results of epigenetic modifications and problems getting the treatment to the proper tissues means that no definitive epi-drug has been created for the disease.

== Local dermatological autoimmune disorders ==
Local dermatological autoimmune disorders are those that effect skin and mucous membranes.

=== Discoid lupus erythematosus (DLE) ===
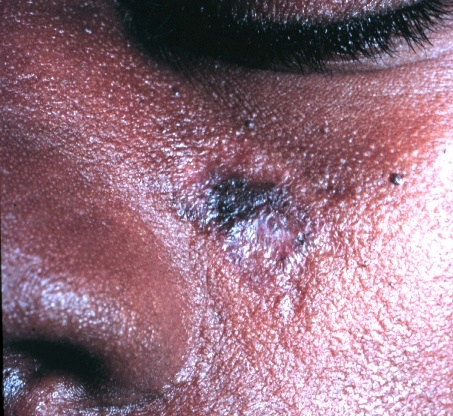
A discoid lupus erythematosus lesion

Discoid lupus erythematosus is one of the most common cutaneous diseases characterized by an attack on healthy epidermal tissue by the immune system leading to lesions on the skin, inflammation, and rashes. Localized DLE lesions will occur on the face, ears, and scalp. Disseminated DLE, below the neck lesions, is unusual if localized DLE lesions are absent. DLE lesions can result in pigment changes, scarring of the skin, potential hair loss, and rare occurrences of squamous cell carcinoma. Differential expression, a significant observed difference in expression levels, of lncRNAs and circRNAs, identified in a study by Xuan et al., alter the mucosa, which is the inner lining and moist part of the epidermis such as inside the mouth and nose; this differential expression affected by DLE causes this tissue to become inflamed and crusty at times. The mucosa serves as a key part in the pathology of this disease. There are transcripts such as lncRNA and circRNAs that have been found to be expressed in affected tissues of those who have DLE. These transcripts were more heavily expressed in the tissue of those affected by DLE as compared to control unaffected healthy tissue. The pattern of expressed lncRNAs and circRNAs helps to discriminate against affected tissue of DLE and healthy unaffected tissues establishing a usable pattern for reference. Additionally, discovered through analysis of the function and expression of lncRNA, lncRNAs are correlated with the expression of Il19, CXCL1, CXCL11, and TNFSF15 which all are related to an immune response helping to identify the pathway in which DLE is manifested epigenetically by the abnormal expression of IncRNA. Another key portion of the study performed by Xuan et al. was the identification of STAT4 as a key transcription factor responsible for influencing the regulation of many target genes involved in DLE. STAT4 is a very important transcription factory as it is correlated with the pathogenesis and this the progression of DLE, many of the STAT4 genes targets have been seen to act to enrich various functional pathways involved in progression.

=== Psoriatic arthritis (PsA) ===
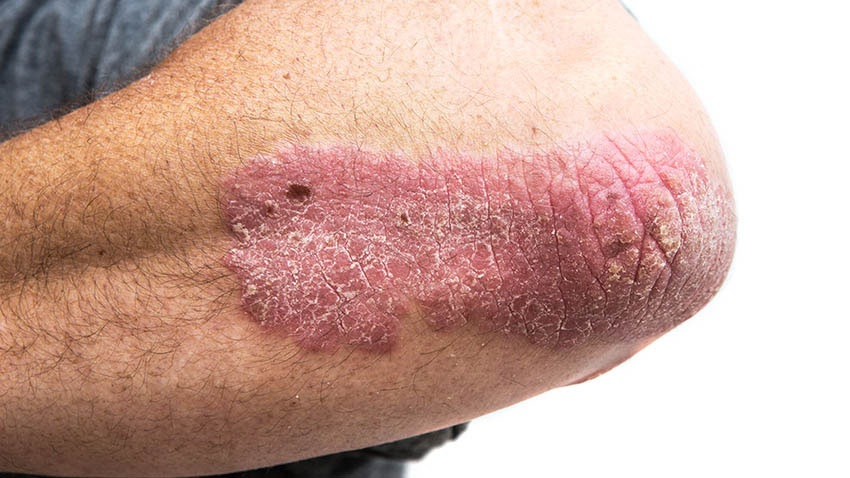
Psoriasis plaque on an elbow

Psoriasis is an inflammatory skin condition characterized by T-cell activation and the development of scaly red patches on the skin caused by the overproduction of skin cells. Psoriasis can be broken down into plaque psoriasis and psoriatic arthritis. Psoriatic arthritis differs from plaque psoriasis because the psoriatic skin lesions are also accompanied by inflammation, joint pain, and joint stiffness attributed to immune system complication produced by psoriasis. Psoriatic arthritis patients secrete high levels of immune-regulated cytokines and chemokines. It has been shown that epigenetics modifications play a prominent role in the symptoms and pathogenesis of this condition. Alterations in miRNA expression levels are one of many epigenetic modifications that accompany the onset of this disease. In particular, miRNA-203 levels are decreased in those with psoriatic arthritis and this has been linked to psoriasis pathogenesis. miRNA-203 is responsible for targeting suppressors of cytokine signaling 3 (SOC3) and ensures that the immune response is kept in check. However, when miRNA-203 levels are low, cytokine signaling occurs at a high level leading to a heightened immune response. Developing a treatment that can increasing miRNA-203 levels has been implicated as a way to decrease the inflammatory immune response observed in patients with this condition. Abnormal expression of HDACs and HATs have also been observed in patients with psoriasis. Peripheral blood mononuclear cells, which are a collection of immune system cells, exhibit a global decrease in acetylation of histone 4 in psoriasis patients as well as increased HDAC-1 levels. HDAC inhibitors have been identified as a potential treatment for psoriasis as well as many other inflammatory autoimmune disorder.

=== Sjogren's syndrome ===
Sjorgen's syndrome is a dermatological autoimmune disorder that targets exocrine glands and attacks lacrimal and salivary glands causing a decrease in the secretion of tears and saliva. This results in inflammation, dry eyes, and dry mouth. Patients with this condition experience a buildup of white blood cells in the salivary glands known as lymphocytic infiltrate. The first confirmed case of Sjogren's syndrome was reported in 1892. Current research is largely focused on the innate immune system's role in the pathogenesis of this diseases. In Sjorgen's patients, miRNA-146a is upregulated in PBMCs and is associated with the pathogenesis of this disease. miRNA-146a plays an important role in regulating the immune system by providing negative feedback to toll-like receptor (TLR) signaling which is used to engage the innate immune response. When miRNA-146a is upregulated, this negative feedback to TLR signaling decreases leading to inflammation and a heightened immune response that can damage healthy cells such as those in the lacrimal and salivary gland. miRNA-150 and miRNA-149 are also upregulated in the salivary glands and lymphocytes of those with Sjorgen's. These miRNAs are targeted to mRNAs that play an important role in immune function and regulating pro-inflammatory cytokine levels. The overexpression of these miRNAs thus leads to a heightened and dysregulated immune response. Epigenetic alterations to the genes of CD4+ T-cell in the immune system are also observed in this condition. Specifically, research has linked hypomethylation of CD70, a T-cell costimulatory gene, to the development of Sjogren's syndrome. Decreased expression of the FOXP3 gene, which leads to DNA hypermethylation, is also observed in these CD4+ T-cells. This causes CpG hypermethylation leading to the downregulation of many cells that are essential for keeping the immune system in check.

=== Alopecia Areata (AA) ===
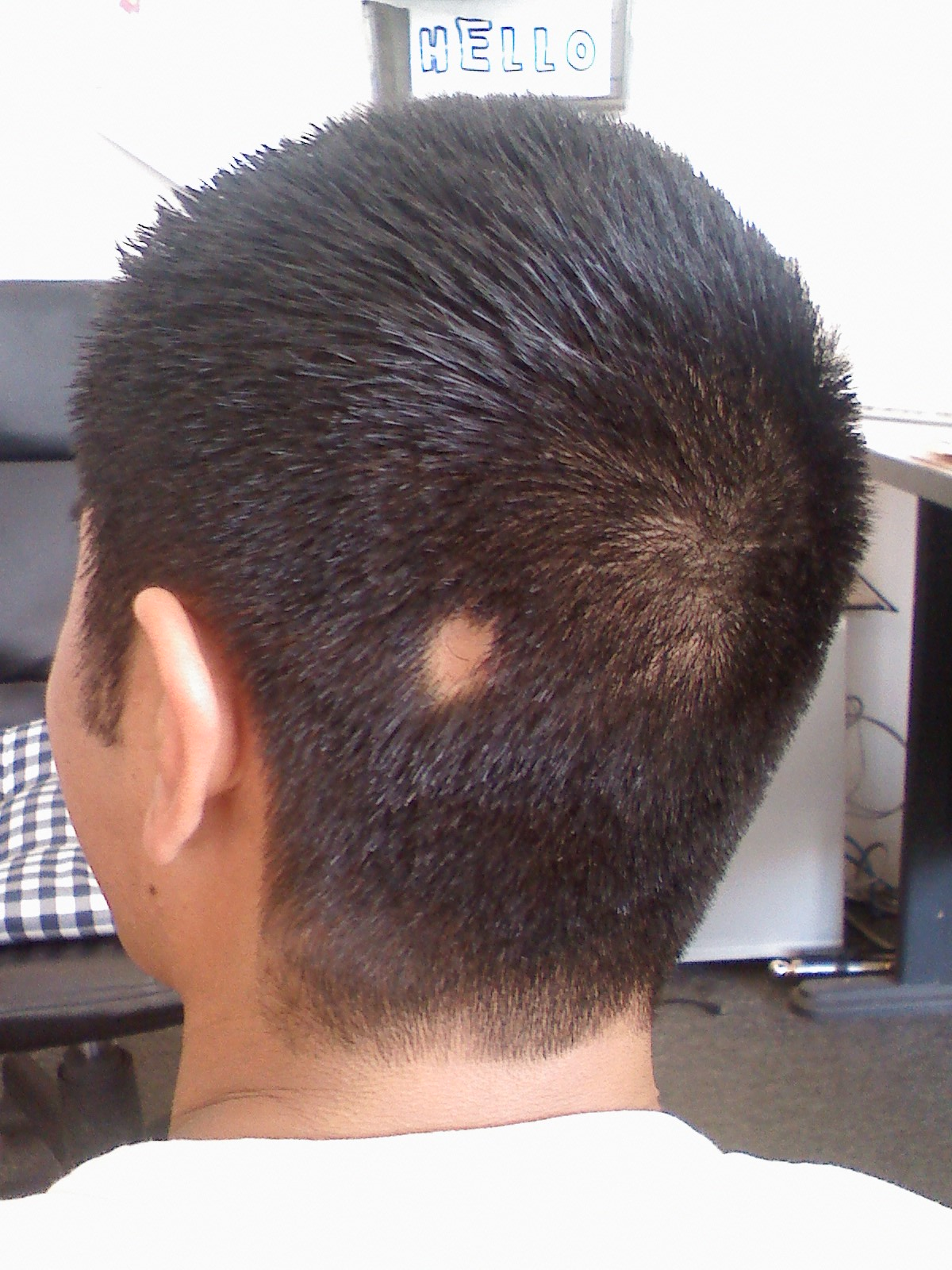
Person with Alopecia areata on the scalp

Alopecia Areata is a dermatological autoimmune condition where the immune system attacks the immune system and causes patchy or total hair loss usually affecting the scalp and face but can cause hair loss on the whole body. The cause of alopecia areata is unknown and typically people with the condition have no other symptoms. Genetic and environmental factors, like stress, are believed to trigger an episode of the condition. This condition was described as "bite alopecia" over 3500 years ago by Cornelius Celsus. The modern term was not used until the early 1700s to late 1800s.

In a study done by Zhou et al. a significant increase in DNA methylation, specifically T-cells, was detected after the analysis of peripheral blood mononuclear cells in patients with AA compared to healthy control cells. Other areas of increased expression included DNA methylation-regulating enzymes, RANTES, E1A binding protein p300, and HDAC1. There were also decreased levels of HDAC2, HDAC7, and LSD1 expression shown in the peripheral blood mononuclear cells. A notable protein in patients with AA is the HDAC1 protein. It has become a more heavily studied protein because of a study with postnatal dermal cells in mice conducted by Park et al. that has shown that a HDAC inhibitor, that is known for upregulating genes that effect hair follicle pathways, is causing HDAC 1 dysregulation in AA patients. This dysregulation is causing patients with AA to have higher serum levels of HDAC1.

== Local endocrinological autoimmune disorders ==
=== Hashimoto's thyroiditis ===
Hashimoto's thyroiditis is an endocrine disease in which a patient's immune system attacks their thyroid gland. Hashimoto's thyroiditis usually manifests via hypothyroidism, which is characterized by the build up of white blood cells in the thyroid and the production of thyroid autoantibodies. Research suggests a strong genetic susceptibility when it comes to autoimmune thyroid diseases like Hashimoto's thyroiditis as well as an epigenetic role in the pathology of Hashimoto's thyroiditis. The thyroglobulin (Tg) gene, a gene involved in the synthesis of the thyroid hormones, thyroxine and triiodothyronine, plays an important role in the pathogenesis of Hashimoto's thyroiditis. In those with Hashimoto's, an alteration in the histone methylation pattern at the thyroglobulin (Tg) promoter has observed causing decreased gene expression and thus decreased production of thyroid hormones. IRF-1 is a transcription factor for Tg whose binding is impacted by histone methylation patterns.

Skewed X chromosome inactivation has also been implicated in autoimmune thyroid diseases. X chromosome inactivation is a process by which one of the two X chromosomes in females is silenced by being converted into transcriptionally inactive heterochromatin. Skewed X chromosome inactivation is an imbalance in the amount of inactivation that occurs between maternal and paternal X chromosomes leading to the favoring of expression of one X chromosome over the other. In studies of Graves' and Hashimoto's disease, the skew of X chromosome inactivation towards one X chromosome over another in the same tissue is markedly high compared to the control without Graves' or Hashimoto's disease; however, it is not clear why preferential expression of a single X chromosome increases the risk of these diseases. Skewed X chromosome activation in one study defined it to be an 80:20 ratio of activation of one X chromosome over another in the same tissue. In Turner syndrome, a chromosomal abnormality in which a person exhibits X chromosome monosomy, patients are at a great risk of developing autoimmune thyroid disease since their genotype mimics an extreme form of X chromosome inactivation since there is only one X chromosome that can be expressed. Though there is no definite mechanism by which skewed X chromosome inactivation influences autoimmune thyroid disease, one possibility being studied is that skewed XCI in the thymus may lead to a lack of thymic expression, ultimately leading to inadequate T cell deletion. X chromosome inactivation is a common and widely studied epigenetic phenomenon.

=== Graves' disease ===
Graves' disease is an autoimmune disease involving thyrotoxicosis, in which the body is affected by the overproduction of thyroid hormone as a result of the immune system attacking the thyroid gland. The overproduction of thyroid hormone is termed hyperthyroidism. Thyrotoxicosis can be caused by hyperthyroidism, thyroiditis, and other conditions. This is generally due to an increase in immunoglobulin antibodies that activate thyroid-stimulating hormone receptor. Like Hashimoto's thyroiditis, Graves' disease is qualified as an autoimmune thyroid disease. The epigenetic processes involved in Hashimoto's thyroiditis are also involved in Graves' disease. Namely, these are the modification of histone methylation in Tg and skewed X chromosome inactivation. In the specific case of Graves' disease, discoveries have been made showing the involvement of abnormal DNA methylation at certain CpG sites. This abnormal DNA methylation leads to interferon signaling and other dysregulated immune system-related processes in cases of Graves' disease. The CpG promoter regions of many genes expressed in immune cells are shown to be hypomethylated in epigenetic analysis of Graves' disease patients, meaning that these genes are over-expressed in these immune cells. For example, CD40L protein levels are observed to be high in patients recently diagnosed with Graves' disease. It has been shown that hypomethylation is observed at the CD40L gene. This gene codes for the CD40 ligand protein that binds the CD40 receptor and this binding activates an immune response. The over expression of this gene thus has been attributed to the onset of autoimmune-mediated hyperthyroidism. Additionally, histone methylation in peripheral blood mononuclear cells is abnormal in individuals with Graves' disease. This abnormality, which manifests as hypermethylation, is observed in epigenetic modifier genes such as the CD3 gene family that regulates T cell behavior as well as the expression of other immune function genes. This results in a decrease of the expression of CD3 gene family members in individuals with Graves' disease. Additionally, the differential expression of certain non-coding RNAs has recently been implicated in the development of Graves' disease, however more research is needed. These non-coding RNAs could potentially serve as biomarkers for Graves' disease diagnosis upon further study.

=== Type I diabetes ===
Type I diabetes is an endocrinological disease in which the immune system's T cells attack the beta cells of the pancreas, disrupting the production of insulin. Though the pathology of Type I diabetes is still being studied, certain epigenetic mechanisms have been implicated in Type I diabetes. Type I diabetes is characterized by global hypermethylation that arises as a result of alterations to homocysteine metabolism. Increased methylation of promoter regions is thought to alter gene expression in ways that cause immune cell dysfunction. Homocysteine metabolism occurs via two pathways. One pathway breaks homocysteine into methionine and then into S-adenosylmethuionine (SAM). Another pathway, the transsulfuration pathway, through numerous steps breaks homocysteine down into glutathionine. Type I diabetics demonstrate insulin insufficiency and this decrease in insulin levels inhibits transsulfuration needed for one of the two pathways of homocysteine breakdown. As a result, homocysteine levels rise and the pathway that converts homocysteine → methionine → SAM becomes the primary method of homocysteine breakdown. In order to accommodate this, DNMTs in S-adenomethionine catalyze methionine breakdown and cause enhanced DNMT activity which leads to global hypermethylation which causes widespread changes to gene expression. DNA demethylation is observed at the gene for HOXA9 transcription factor and DNA hypermethylation is observed at the FOXP3 immune response gene promoter region. HOXA9 codes for a protein involved in hematopoietic stem cell generation and is hypomethylated in the case of Type I diabetes. Recently, an enrichment of differentially variable CpG positions has been identified, which indicates the involvement of altered DNA methylation levels in Type I diabetes pathogenesis. More study is needed on this front. Increased DNA methylation variability in immune effector cells in type I diabetes has also demonstrated the involvement of DNA methylation in other processes related to type I diabetes' pathogenesis as well.

== Local gastrointestinal autoimmune disorders ==
=== Celiac disease ===
Celiac disease is a disease in which the small intestine is damaged in those whose bodies are unable to process gluten because of a T cell response that is activated when gluten, from foods such as wheat or rye, is present in the intestines. Several epigenetic mechanisms are implicated in celiac disease, such as DNA methylation, histone modification, and non-coding RNAs. These epigenetic mechanisms are involved in the pathogenesis of celiac disease as well as altered in those with a predisposition for celiac disease. Furthermore, unusual methylation in the genes involved in the core NF-κB pathway, a regulator of innate immunity, is implicated in the pathogenesis of celiac disease. A high rate of DNA methylation of CpGs contributes to the development of small bowel adenocarcinomas, which are malignant tumors, in individuals with celiac disease. This CpG hypermethylation is correlated to the loss of expression of the MLH-1 gene, which is involved in DNA repair. Furthermore, hypermethylation of the APC gene, a tumor suppressor gene, has been found to cause defects in the mismatch repair mechanisms in individuals with celiac disease. An increase in histone acetylation, specifically H3K27ac, has also been found in celiac disease biopsies. When comparing the genes of three different cytokines in response to cytotoxic T lymphocytes in celiac biopsies, an increase in H3K27ac in the promoter and enhancer regions was found in the cytokine INFꞵ genes. The regulation of certain microRNAs differs significantly in individuals with celiac disease compared to individuals without celiac disease. These differences were found to come in the form of downregulation of some microRNAs and upregulation of others. This differential regulation likely occurs for microRNAs involved in modulating intestinal barrier function, though more study is needed specific to celiac disease.

== Local neurological autoimmune disorders ==
=== Multiple sclerosis (MS) ===
Multiple sclerosis is a neurological disease characterized by the immune system attacking and destroying the myelin sheaths that coat nerve fibers. Destruction of these sheaths leads to the slowing or loss of electrical transmission of messages across nerve cells and as a result, patients experience weakness, pain, and vision loss. It has been shown that vitamin D deficiency is associated with alteration to epigenetic markers and MS pathogenesis. Vitamin D plays an important role in suppressing autoimmunity and in particular Th17 autoimmunity. Th17 is a subset of T helper cells that secrete pro-inflammatory interleukin(IL)-17. Traditionally vitamin D suppresses transcription of IL17 via recruitment of HDAC2 to the IL17A promoter, however in those deficient in vitamin D, IL17 transcription is increased leading to a heightened inflammatory immune response. Increased expression of miRNA-326 in PBMC cells is also prevalent in those with MS and is known to encourage Th17 cell differentiation. Histone H3 citrullination, which alters the methylation of arginine residues and consequently chromatin structure and gene expression, has been shown to be increased in the brains of MS patients as well. Although more research is needed to understand the mechanism of how histone H3 citrullination contributes to demyelination, research demonstrates that inhibitors of the enzymes involved in this citrullination improve the outlook and progression of this disease.

=== Myasthenia gravis (MG) ===
Myasthenia gravis is an autoimmune disease that causes weakness and dysfunction of the patient's skeletal muscles as a result of extensive neurological damage that destroys the communication between the nerves and the muscles. It has been found that individuals who have Myasthenia Gravis possess high levels of the acetylcholine receptor antibody, AchR-Ab, which recruits the immune system to destroy the ACh receptors present at neuromuscular junctions. A significantly higher levels of methylation in the CTLA-4 region is observed in MG patients compared to controls. CTLA-4 gene expression serves as a negative regulator of T-Reg cells and suppress the immune response. When there is a blockade of expression of the CTLA-4 region, as is seen in those with MG, increased T-cell activation occurs and a heightened immune response is observed. The expression of the CTLA-4 generating cytokines that regulate AchR-Ab autoantibodies require further exploration to better understand their mechanism of action.
