= Pseudo gray platelet syndrome =

- Specialty: Hematology

Pseudo gray platelet syndrome was described by Cockbill, Burmester, and Heptinstall (1988) who reported a 25-year-old woman with a history of mild bruising and bleeding. Another case was described in Japan in 2002.

== Presentation ==
Bleeding time, activated partial thromboplastin time, prothrombin time, and euglobulin lysis time were within normal limits. There were no platelet antibodies detected. The patient's mother and two sisters had histories of easy bruising and heavy menstrual periods. A brother had no reported bleeding tendencies. Platelets from the mother, sisters, and a daughter were normal in number and appearance under the light microscope. Platelets in blood collected into EDTA tubes appeared gray and agranular compared with platelets from blood in citrate or heparin. The key finding is under electron microscopy, EDTA-exposed platelets showed extensive activation, with loss of storage granule contents and pseudopod formation. Platelet aggregation studies were normal.

The abnormal platelet reaction following EDTA exposure is thought to be caused by a plasma factor, although not an immunoglobulin. The mechanism by which platelet activation occurs remains unknown. Few cases have been reported in the literature.

== Diagnosis ==
=== Comparison to gray platelet syndrome ===
Pseudo-gray platelet syndrome differs from gray platelet syndrome (GPS), one of the giant platelet syndromes. GPS is characterized by "thrombocytopenia, abnormally large agranular platelets in peripheral blood smears, and almost total absence of platelet alpha-granules and their constituents." The defect in GPS is the failure of megakaryocytes to package secretory proteins into alpha-granules. Patients with the GPS are affected by mild to moderate bleeding tendencies.
