= Post-transfusion purpura =

Purpura spots

Post-transfusion purpura (PTP) is a delayed adverse reaction to a blood transfusion or platelet transfusion that occurs when the body has produced alloantibodies to the allogeneic transfused platelets' antigens. These alloantibodies destroy the patient's platelets leading to thrombocytopenia, a rapid decline in platelet count. PTP usually presents 5–12 days after transfusion, and is a potentially fatal condition in rare cases. Approximately 85% of cases occur in women.

== Mechanism ==
PTP is rare, but usually occurs in women who have had multiple pregnancies or in people who have undergone previous transfusions. The precise mechanism leading to PTP is unknown, but it most commonly occurs in individuals whose platelets lack the HPA-1a antigen (old name: PL^{A1}). The patient develops antibodies to the HPA-1a antigen leading to platelet destruction. In some cases, HPA-5b has also been implicated. It is unclear why alloantibodies attack the patient's own, as well as any transfused allogeneic random donor platelets. Probable explanation for this is that the recipient's platelets acquire the phenotype of donor's platelet by binding of the soluble antigens from the donor onto the recipient's platelet.

== Treatment ==
Symptoms are usually sudden in onset and self-limiting, most often resolving within 2 weeks. IVIG therapy is the primary treatment. Additionally, PTP is an American Society for Apheresis Category III indication for plasmapheresis.

== See also ==
- Blood transfusion
- Neonatal alloimmune thrombocytopenia
