= NBEAL2 =

Protein-coding gene in the species Homo sapiens

Identifiers
- Aliases: NBEAL2, BDPLT4, GPS, neurobeachin like 2
- External IDs: OMIM: 614169; MGI: 2448554; GeneCards: NBEAL2

Gene location (Human)
Chr.	Chromosome 3 (human)
Band	3p21.31	Start	46,979,666 bp
Band	3p21.31	End	47,009,704 bp

Gene location (Mouse)
Chr.	Chromosome 9 (mouse)
Band	9|9 F2	Start	110,453,857 bp
Band	9|9 F2	End	110,483,229 bp
RNA expression pattern
Bgee	Human / Mouse (ortholog); Top expressed in: granulocyte; skin of abdomen; skin of leg; upper lobe of left lung; right lung; body of pancreas; spleen; minor salivary glands; monocyte; body of stomach / Top expressed in: granulocyte; thymus; corneal stroma; esophagus; lip; conjunctival fornix; tibiofemoral joint; epithelium of stomach; medullary collecting duct; yolk sac; More reference expression data
BioGPS	n/a
Gene ontology
Molecular function	phospholipid binding; protein binding
Cellular component	endoplasmic reticulum; membrane; plasma membrane; tertiary granule membrane; ficolin-1-rich granule membrane
Biological process	platelet formation; neutrophil degranulation
Sources:Amigo / QuickGO
Orthologs
Databases	NCBI: entry; OMA: entry
Species	Human	Mouse
Entrez	23218	235627
Ensembl	ENSG00000160796	ENSMUSG00000056724
UniProt	Q6ZNJ1	Q6ZQA0
RefSeq (mRNA)	NM_015175; NM_001365116	NM_183276
RefSeq (protein)	NP_055990; NP_001352045	NP_899099
Location (UCSC)	Chr 3: 46.98 – 47.01 Mb	Chr 9: 110.45 – 110.48 Mb
PubMed search
- Wikidata
View/Edit Human	View/Edit Mouse

Neurobeachin-like 2 is a protein that in humans is encoded by the NBEAL2 gene.

== Function ==
The protein encoded by this gene contains a beige and Chediak-Higashi (BEACH) domain and multiple WD40 domains, and may play a role in megakaryocyte alpha-granule biogenesis.

== Clinical relevance ==
Mutation in this gene have been shown to cause gray platelet syndrome.
