= Harris platelet syndrome =

- Specialty: Hematology

Harris platelet syndrome, previously known as asymptomatic constitutional macrothrombocytopenia, is the most common inherited giant platelet disorder in the Indian subcontinent. It is characterized by a functional thrombocytopenia due to the presence of giant platelet cells.

== Presentation ==
Harris platelet syndrome was identified among healthy blood donors in the north-eastern part of the Indian subcontinent, characterized by absent bleeding symptoms, mild to severe thrombocytopenia (platelets rarely < 50 × 10^{9}/L) with giant platelets (Mean platelet volume 10fL) and normal platelet aggregation studies with absent MYH9 mutation.

In the blood donors with Harris platelet syndrome, authors found a statistically higher mean platelet volume, red cell distribution width, lower platelet count and platelet biomass.

Harris platelet syndrome has been discovered in individuals without a north-east Indian ethnic background, broadening the scope of possible ethnicities that are effected and emphasizing the importance of adequate laboratory studies.

== Diagnosis ==
The diagnosis of Harris platelet syndrome is made by ascertaining the ethnicity of the patient, as well as assessing for conditions causing acquired thrombocytopenias, and after also excluding the known inherited giant platelet disorders and other causes of thrombocytopenia. The diagnostic approach typically consists of blood tests and blood smears to check for platelet count, size, and morphology; more advanced tests can be used to determine platelet function. Genetic testing is also commonly done.

== Treatment ==
Patients with Harris platelet syndrome do not suffer from bleeding disorders despite a low platelet count. The unique structure of the megakaryocytes allow them to be functional in clotting, therefore making Harris platelet syndrome relatively benign. Additionally, it has been found that patients with Harris platelet syndrome have a low risk of bleeding during surgery. Some patients with inherited giant platelet disorders are treated inappropriately with corticosteroids, immunoglobulin infusions and even splenectomy.

== Mechanism ==
Actin-binding proteins have been linked to maintaining the structure of the large platelets. However, enzymatic activity allows for functional clotting activity regardless of the size of the thrombocytes. Genomic studies have found mutations in various pathways that could be the cause of Harris platelet syndrome, but further studies are required.

== Prevalence ==
Harris platelet syndrome has been found in up to one-third of all blood donors In the West Bengal region of India. It is also frequently found in the north-east region of South Asia, including Nepal, Bhutan, and Bangladesh in addition to India.

== Terminology ==
In 2002, this syndrome was called "asymptomatic constitutional macro thrombocytopenia".

In 2005, to avoid confusion between asymptomatic constitutional macro thrombocytopenia and congenital amegakaryocytic thrombocytopenia, the latter was called Harris platelet syndrome.
