= Giant platelet disorder =

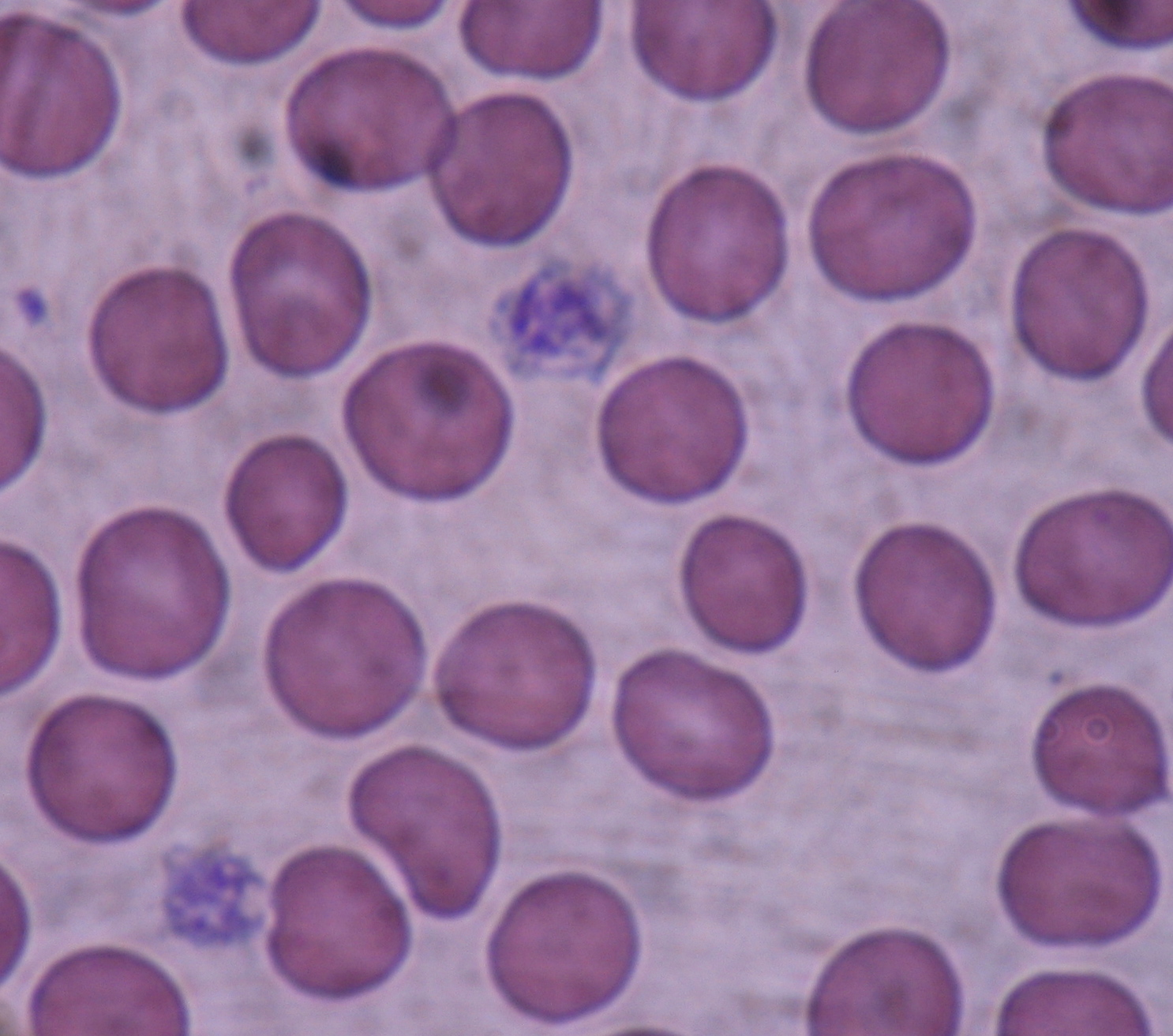
- Two giant platelets (stained purple) are visible in this image from a light microscope (40×) from a peripheral blood smear surrounded by red blood cells. One normal platelet can be seen in the upper left side of the image (purple) and is significantly smaller in size than the red blood cells (stained pink).
- Specialty: Hematology

Giant platelet disorders, also known as macrothrombocytopenia, are rare disorders featuring abnormally large platelets, thrombocytopenia and a tendency to bleeding. Giant platelets cannot stick adequately to injured blood vessel walls, resulting in abnormal bleeding when injured. Giant platelet disorder occurs for inherited diseases like Bernard–Soulier syndrome, gray platelet syndrome and May–Hegglin anomaly.

== Signs and symptoms ==
Symptoms usually present from the period of birth to early childhood as: nose bleeds, bruising, and/or gum bleeding. Problems later in life may arise from anything that can cause internal bleeding such as: stomach ulcers, surgery, trauma, or menstruation. Abnormality of the abdomen, nosebleeds, heavy menstrual bleeding, purpura, too few platelets circulating in the blood, and prolonged bleeding time have also been listed as symptoms of various giant platelet disorders.

== Genetics ==
Many of the further classifications of giant platelet disorder occur as a result of being genetically passed down through families as an autosomal recessive disorder, such as in Bernard-Soulier syndrome and gray platelet syndrome.

== Diagnosis ==
People may be diagnosed after prolonged and/or recurring bleeding episodes. Children and adults may also be diagnosed after profuse bleeding after a trauma or tooth extraction. Ultimately, a laboratory diagnosis is usually required. This would utilize platelet aggregation studies and flow cytometry.

=== Classification ===
Giant platelet disorders can be further categorized:

- caused by auto-immune disorders, for example Immune thrombocytopenic purpura (ITP), and characterized by low platelet count, but high MPV (mean platelet volume).
- Caused by glycoprotein abnormalities: Bernard–Soulier syndrome, velocardiofacial syndrome
- Caused by calpain defect: Montreal platelet syndrome
- Caused by alpha granules defect: gray platelet syndrome
- Characterized by abnormal neutrophil inclusions: May–Hegglin anomaly, Sebastian syndrome
- With systemic manifestations: Hereditary macrothrombocytopenia with hearing loss, Epstein syndrome, Fechtner syndrome
- With no specific abnormalities: Mediterranean macrothrombocytopenia
- Harris platelet syndrome

== Treatment ==
There has been no general recommendation for treatment of patients with giant platelet disorders, as there are many different specific classifications to further categorize this disorder which each need differing treatments. Platelet transfusion is the main treatment for people presenting with bleeding symptoms. There have been experiments with DDAVP (1-deamino-8-arginine vasopressin) and splenectomy on people with giant platelet disorders with mixed results, making this type of treatment contentious.
