= Platelet transfusion refractoriness =

Platelet reduction following transfusion

Platelet transfusion refractoriness is the repeated failure to achieve the desired level of blood platelets in a patient following a platelet transfusion. The cause of refractoriness may be either immune or non-immune. Among immune-related refractoriness, antibodies against HLA antigens are the primary cause. Non-immune causes include splenomegaly (enlargement of the spleen), fever, and sepsis.

== Cause ==
Platelet refractoriness can be due to immune causes or non-immune causes. Non-immune causes account for over 80% of cases of platelet refractoriness, and sepsis is one of the most common non-immune causes. HLA alloimmunization is the commonest immune cause of platelet refractoriness.

=== Non-immune causes ===
==== Patient-related ====
- Sepsis
- Fever
- Disseminated intravascular coagulation
- Splenomegaly
- Treatment of infection, antibiotics (vancomycin), antifungals (amphotericin B)
- Graft-versus-host disease
- Hepatic veno-occlusive disease
- Bleeding

==== Platelet component-related ====
- Age of platelet component
- ABO mismatch between platelet component and recipient
- Number of platelets within the component if platelet increment (PI) is used to calculate platelet refractoriness
- Pathogen-reduced platelet component

=== Immune causes ===
- Alloantibodies to platelet antigens
  - Human leucocyte antigen (HLA) antibodies
  - Human platelet antigen (HPA) antibodies
- Immune complexes
- Other antibodies
  - Drug-related antibodies

== Diagnosis ==
Platelet transfusion refractoriness can be defined in several different ways. All measures of platelet refractoriness are defined by the timing of the post-transfusion platelet count, usually 1 hour post transfusion or 24 hours post transfusion or both.

=== Platelet increment (PI) ===
This is the simplest method, and only requires data on the platelet count before and after the transfusion. The platelet increment is also known as the absolute count increment and count increment.

PI = post-transfusion platelet count - pre-transfusion platelet count

However, it is affected by the number of platelets given in the transfusion (platelet dose) and the patient's blood volume. Larger patients and smaller platelet doses decrease the platelet increment. These factors are adjusted for in the other methods of defining platelet refractoriness.

A 1-hour post-transfusion PI of less than 5 to 10 × 10^{9}/l is considered evidence of platelet refractoriness. Due to lack of data on platelet dose this is often the only measure of platelet refractoriness that can be performed in routine clinical practice.

=== Percentage platelet recovery (PPR) ===
Requires data on the platelet increment (PI), the patient's total blood volume (TBV) - estimated using the patient's weight multiplied by 0.075, and the number of platelets transfused (platelet dose)

PPR = ((PI × TBV)/PD) × 100

At 1 hour post-transfusion, a PPR < 20% is considered evidence of platelet refractoriness. At 16 hours post-transfusion a PPR < 10% is considered evidence of platelet refractoriness.

=== Percentage platelet increment (PPI) ===
PPI is very similar to the percentage platelet recovery (PPR) but there has been an additional adjustment for splenic pooling of platelets (PPR multiplied by 2/3)

PPI = PPR/0.67 = ((PI / 0.67) × TBV)/PD × 100

=== Corrected count increment (CCI) ===
This requires data on the platelet increment (PI, in platelets/μL), the patient's Body surface area (BSA, in m^{2}), and the number of platelets transfused (PD, in 10^{11}).

${CCI} = PI * \frac{BSA}{PD}$

For example, a PI of 25,000 platelets/μL, a BSA of 1.8m^{2} and a PD of 4×10^{11} gives a CCI of 11,250 platelets*m^{2}/10^{11}μL

At 1 hour post-transfusion a CCI greater than 7500 indicates a sufficient post-transfusion increment, whereas a CCI less than 7500 is considered diagnostic of platelet refractoriness. At 24 hours post transfusion a CCI less than 5000 suggests platelet refractoriness.

=== Platelet dose ===
Some blood banks maintain records of the estimated number of platelets in each unit. Current requirements in the US stipulate that a unit of apheresis platelets must contain at least 3.0 ×10^{11} platelets. In England only 1% of adult platelet components are tested to check the number of platelets meet the minimum required standard of 2.4 × 10^{11} platelets. Only components that contain fewer than 1.6 × 10^{11} platelets are discarded. This means that there can be a lot of variability in the number of platelets contained within each transfusion.

== Treatment ==
Treatment depends on the underlying cause.

Non-immune causes are usually treated by treating the underlying cause e.g. sepsis.

If there is no obvious non-immune cause, a first step can be to use platelet components that are likely to produce the greatest platelet increment (less than 3 days old and ABO-matched), while further investigations are performed (testing for HLA antibodies).

If an immune cause is suspected and HLA antibodies are detected, then HLA-selected platelet components can be used. Although HLA-selected platelets lead to improved platelet increments at 1 hour post-transfusion, there is currently insufficient evidence to demonstrate their clinical effectiveness at preventing bleeding.

If HLA antibodies are not detected, and HPA antibodies are detected, then HPA-selected or crossmatched platelet components can be used.

HLA and HPA-selected components should not be used if no HLA or HPA antibodies are detected.

Other strategies for managing patients with platelet refractoriness who require procedures include thrombopoietin receptor agonists, complement inhibitors such as eculizumab, and slow infusion.
