= Human platelet antigen =

Polymorphisms in platelet antigens

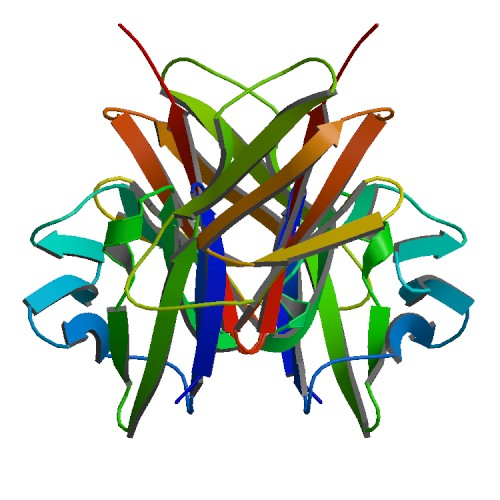
Glycoprotein

Human platelet antigens (HPA) are polymorphisms in platelet antigens. These can stimulate production of alloantibodies (that is, antibodies against other people's antigens) in recipients of transfused platelets from donors with different HPAs. These antibodies cause neonatal alloimmune thrombocytopenia, post-transfusion purpura, and platelet transfusion refractoriness to infusion of donor platelets.

== Nomenclature ==
HPAs are expressed as variable sequences on platelet surface glycoproteins. The variants are distinguished by single nucleotide polymorphisms (SNPs), leading to single amino‑acid substitutions, except for HPA‑14bw which involves a more complex variant.

To date, more than 33 HPAs have been identified on six major platelet glycoprotein complexes: GPIIb, GPIIIa, GPIa, GPIbα, GPIbβ and CD109. Typically, twelve of these antigens form six biallelic systems (HPA‑1, ‑2, ‑3, ‑4, ‑5, and ‑15); the others, while serologically confirmed as antigens, lack recognized antithetical counterparts. The International Society of Blood Transfusion (ISBT) established standardized numeric nomenclature for HPAs.

Each major HPA system corresponds to a specific platelet glycoprotein. HPA‑1 resides on integrin β3 (GPIIb/IIIa). The HPA‑1a/1b polymorphism involves a leucine-to-proline substitution and is the most immunogenic system in Caucasians. HPA‑2, ‑3, ‑4, ‑5, and ‑15 are localized respectively to GPIbα, GPIIb/IIIa integrin α‑subunits, GPIbα or GPIbβ, and CD109, each with different amino acid substitutions.

The remaining minor HPAs are also mapped to these glycoprotein complexes but typically are less immunogenic or of limited frequency.

== Clinical importance ==
The two major clinical conditions associated with HPA proteins are neonatal alloimmune thrombocytopenia and platelet transfusion refractoriness.

=== Alloimmune Thrombocytopenia ===
Fetal/neonatal alloimmune thrombocytopenia occurs when an HPA-negative mother (commonly lacking HPA‑1a) is exposed to paternal antigens on the fetus, generating anti‑HPA antibodies. These IgG alloantibodies cross the placenta, leading to fetal thrombocytopenia. Severe cases can result in intracranial hemorrhage or neonatal death.

=== Platelet transfusion Refractoriness ===
In platelet transfusion refractoriness, antibodies to platelet via human platelet antigens (HLAs) may form after platelet transfusion. These antibodies destroy donor platelets (causing "refractoriness" to the transfusion), which may lead to post-transfusion purpura. Platelet refractoriness can also result from anti‑HLA class I alloantibodies, which may elevate risk more than 100‑fold compared to platelet antigen mismatches.

Other potentially medically-relevant roles of HPAs include mediation of platelet-erythrocyte adhesion in malaria, and platelet-mediated surveillance of cancerous cells.
