= CAMT =

CAMT may refer to:

- Commission on Accreditation of Medical Transport Systems
- Congenital amegakaryocytic thrombocytopenia
