= ATXN2L =

Protein-coding gene in the species Homo sapiens

Identifiers
- Aliases: ATXN2L, A2D, A2LG, A2LP, A2RP, ataxin 2 like
- External IDs: OMIM: 607931; MGI: 2446242; GeneCards: ATXN2L

Gene location (Human)
Chr.	Chromosome 16 (human)
Band	16p11.2	Start	28,823,035 bp
Band	16p11.2	End	28,837,237 bp

Gene location (Mouse)
Chr.	Chromosome 7 (mouse)
Band	7|7 F3	Start	126,491,708 bp
Band	7|7 F3	End	126,503,437 bp
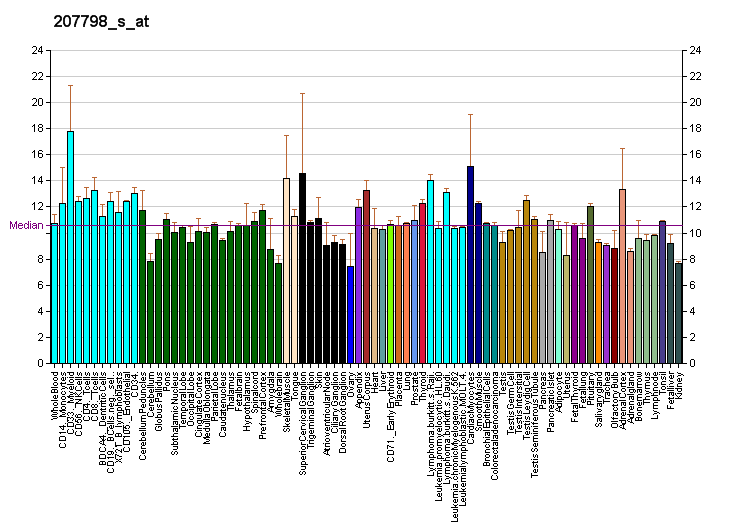

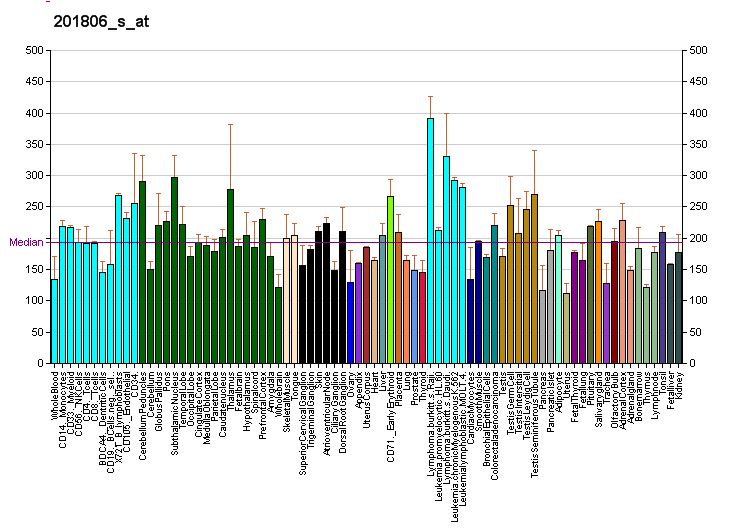
RNA expression pattern
Bgee	Human / Mouse (ortholog); Top expressed in: left testis; right testis; right hemisphere of cerebellum; anterior pituitary; granulocyte; beta cell; olfactory bulb; body of uterus; left lobe of thyroid gland; right lobe of thyroid gland / Top expressed in: zygote; secondary oocyte; Rostral migratory stream; tail of embryo; genital tubercle; neural layer of retina; granulocyte; spermatocyte; spermatid; primary visual cortex; More reference expression data
BioGPS	More reference expression data
Gene ontology
Molecular function	protein binding; cadherin binding; RNA binding
Cellular component	nucleus; nuclear speck; membrane; cytoplasmic stress granule; cytoplasm; cytosol
Biological process	regulation of cytoplasmic mRNA processing body assembly; stress granule assembly
Sources:Amigo / QuickGO
Orthologs
Databases	NCBI: entry; OMA: entry
Species	Human	Mouse
Entrez	11273	233871
Ensembl	ENSG00000168488	ENSMUSG00000032637
UniProt	Q8WWM7	Q7TQH0
RefSeq (mRNA)	NM_001308230; NM_007245; NM_017492; NM_145714; NM_148414 NM_148415; NM_148416	NM_183020; NM_001347658; NM_001361487
RefSeq (protein)	NP_001295159; NP_009176; NP_059867; NP_663760; NP_680780 NP_680781; NP_680782	NP_001334587; NP_898841; NP_001348416
Location (UCSC)	Chr 16: 28.82 – 28.84 Mb	Chr 7: 126.49 – 126.5 Mb
PubMed search
- Wikidata
View/Edit Human	View/Edit Mouse

Ataxin-2-like protein was initially identified in 1996 and designated Ataxin-2 Related protein (A2RP) as the search for the gene causing SCA2 lead to the identification of 2 cDNA clones with high similarity to ATXN2 (Pulst et al, 1996). It was later renamed as ATXN2L. It is a protein that in humans is encoded by the ATXN2L gene.

This gene encodes an ataxin type 2 related protein of unknown function. This protein is a member of the spinocerebellar ataxia (SCAs) family, which is associated with a complex group of neurodegenerative disorders. Several alternatively spliced transcripts encoding different isoforms have been found for this gene.

== Interactions ==
ATXN2L has been shown to interact with Myeloproliferative leukemia virus oncogene.
