= Robert Hegglin =

- Born: 5 May 1907
- Died: 22 November 1969 (aged 62)
- Known for: May Hegglin anomaly
- Scientific career
- Fields: medicine

Robert Hegglin (5 May 1907 – 22 November 1969) was a Swiss medical doctor, responsible for the characterization of May Hegglin anomaly. Robert Hegglin is also noteworthy for his diary entries during World War II that describe the genocide on Jews committed by German Einsatzgruppen and local collaborators in the Baltics: He had taken part in a humanitarian mission of the Swiss Red Cross in Riga, Daugavpils and Pskov in June - September 1942 and learned from "German soldiers, officers and Latvians...that 100,000 Jews have been shot in the Riga area since the German occupation".
