= Gray platelet syndrome =

- Other names: Platelet alpha-granule deficiency
- Gray platelet syndrome is inherited in an autosomal recessive manner.
- Specialty: Hematology

Gray platelet syndrome (GPS), or platelet alpha-granule deficiency, is a rare congenital autosomal recessive bleeding disorder caused by a reduction or absence of alpha-granules in blood platelets, and the release of proteins normally contained in these granules into the marrow, causing myelofibrosis. The name derives from the initial observation of gray appearance of platelets with a paucity of granules on blood films from a patient with a lifelong bleeding disorder.

== Signs and symptoms ==
Signs of GPS typically arise at birth or in childhood, these signs and symptoms include thrombocytopenia, bruising susceptibility, and epistaxis. Typically, the observed low platelet count in individuals is progressive, this can result in fatal hemorrhages later in life. Additionally, females who are affected may experience irregular menstrual cycles and heavy menstrual bleeding. Another common effect of GPS is myelofibrosis, where scar tissue builds up in the bone marrow causing it to be unable to produce a sufficient amount of blood cells. To compensate, other organs such as the spleen start to produce more blood cells which can lead to splenomegaly.

== Genetics ==
GPS is primarily inherited in an autosomal recessive manner. The gene that is mutated in GPS has been mapped to chromosome 3p and identified as NBEAL2. The location is 3p21.31. This is caused by a homozygous or compound heterozygous mutations in the NBEAL2 gene. NBEAL2 encodes a protein containing a BEACH domain that is predicted to be involved in vesicular trafficking. It is expressed in platelets and megakaryocytes and is required for the development of platelet alpha-granules. NBEAL2 expression is also required for the development of thrombocytes in zebrafish.

In Japan, GPS was found in 24 affected patients in a single family. There was at least 1 instance of male-to-male transmission, consistent with autosomal dominant inheritance.

A study reported of 14 families with GPS, 11 families had clear autosomal recessive inheritance. This was evidenced by consanguinity or multiple affected siblings with unaffected parents. The families had various backgrounds, including Bedouin, Turkish, Mennonite, French, German, Somali, African American, and mixed Northern and Southern European.

GPS is characterized by "thrombocytopenia, and abnormally large agranular platelets in peripheral blood smears." The defect in GPS is the failure of megakaryocytes to package secretory proteins into alpha-granules. Patients with the GPS are affected by mild to moderate bleeding tendencies. Usually these are not major bleeds but there has been some life-threatening cases. Affected women will tend to have heavy, irregular periods. Myelofibrosis is a condition that usually comes with GPS.

== Diagnosis ==
GPS is diagnosed based on clinical findings and requires demonstration of absence or marked reduction of alpha-granules by electron microscopy (EM). High serum vitamin B12 levels are common in patients diagnosed with GPS. Bone marrow sampling, though not required for diagnosis of GPS, might be necessary to evaluate myelofibrosis occurring in GPS and to exclude other disorders.

== Management ==
There is no specific treatment for GPS, but it can be managed by anticipating and preventing the risks of bleeding. The treatment options include desmopressin. Splenectomy can be used to increase the platelet counts in those whose platelet counts decrease to approximately 30,000/microliter. Prognosis is generally good early in life when thrombocytopenia is mild.

== Epidemiology ==
Currently, only 60 cases have been recorded worldwide. While the prevalence of this syndrome is not known, it was found that it affects males and females equally.

== See also ==
- Pseudo gray platelet syndrome
- Giant platelet disorder
