= Thrombopoietin receptor =

Protein found in humans

MPL

Identifiers
- Aliases: MPL, C-CD110, MPLV, THCYT2, TPOR, MPL proto-oncogene, thrombopoietin receptor, THPOR
- External IDs: OMIM: 159530; MGI: 97076; GeneCards: MPL

Gene location (Human)
Chr.	Chromosome 1 (human)
Band	1p34.2	Start	43,337,818 bp
Band	1p34.2	End	43,354,466 bp

Gene location (Mouse)
Chr.	Chromosome 4 (mouse)
Band	4 D2.1|4 54.61 cM	Start	118,299,612 bp
Band	4 D2.1|4 54.61 cM	End	118,314,710 bp
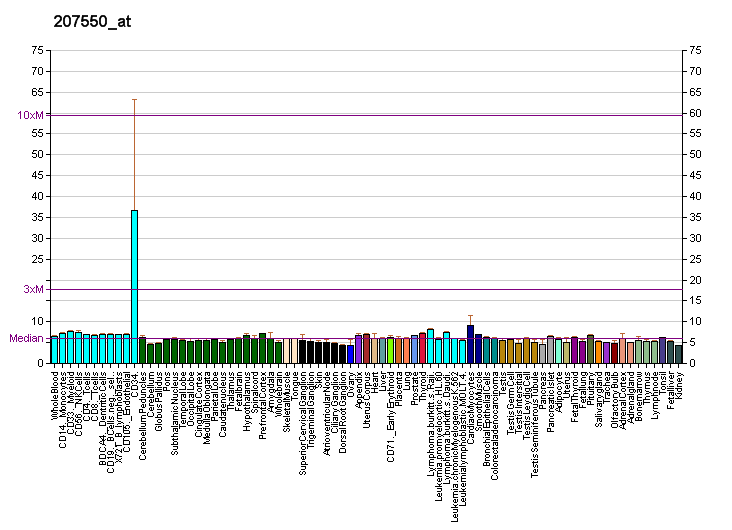

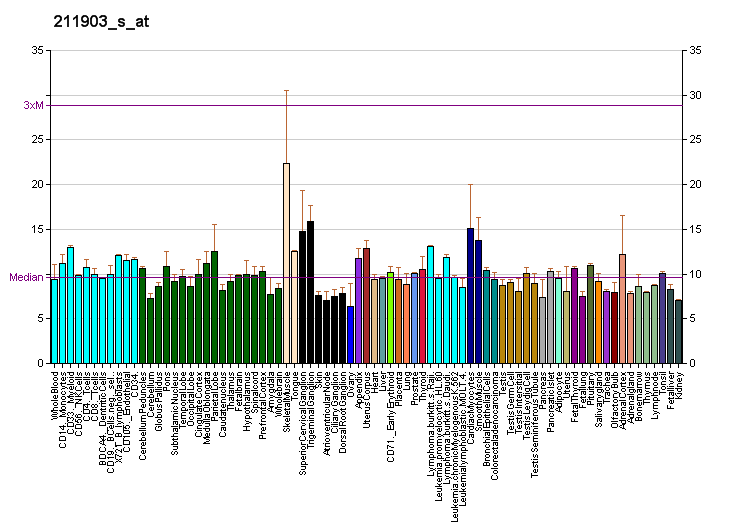

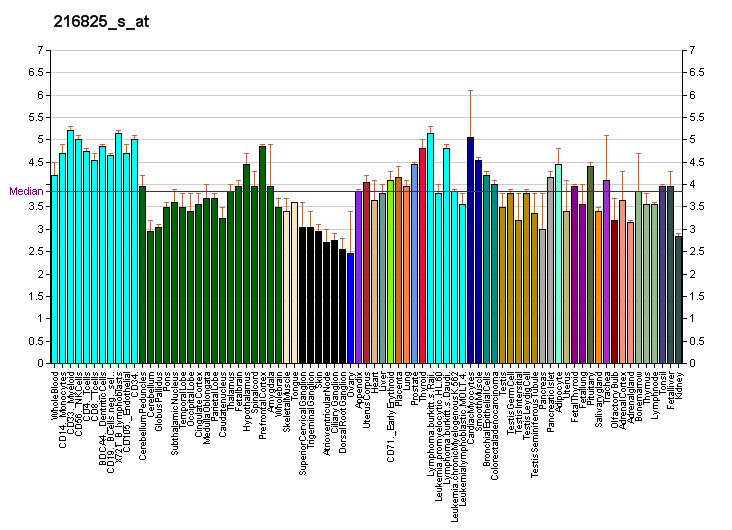
RNA expression pattern
Bgee	Human / Mouse (ortholog); Top expressed in: testicle; mononuclear cell; monocyte; right frontal lobe; bone marrow cell; bronchial epithelial cell; sural nerve; left ovary; Brodmann area 9; prefrontal cortex / Top expressed in: blood; gastrula; vasculature of trunk; tibiofemoral joint; embryo; dorsal aorta; morula; yolk sac; embryo; spleen; More reference expression data
BioGPS	More reference expression data
Gene ontology
Molecular function	cytokine receptor activity; protein binding; transmembrane signaling receptor activity; thrombopoietin receptor activity
Cellular component	integral component of membrane; cell surface; Golgi apparatus; integral component of plasma membrane; membrane; plasma membrane; neuron projection; soma
Biological process	cell surface receptor signaling pathway; cell population proliferation; cytokine-mediated signaling pathway; thrombopoietin-mediated signaling pathway; neutrophil homeostasis; monocyte homeostasis; positive regulation of lymphocyte proliferation; platelet aggregation; cellular response to hypoxia; positive regulation of platelet formation; eosinophil homeostasis; basophil homeostasis
Sources:Amigo / QuickGO
Orthologs
Databases	NCBI: entry; OMA: entry
Species	Human	Mouse
Entrez	4352	17480
Ensembl	ENSG00000117400	ENSMUSG00000006389
UniProt	P40238	Q08351
RefSeq (mRNA)	NM_005373	NM_001122949; NM_001285496; NM_001285497; NM_010823
RefSeq (protein)	NP_005364	NP_001116421; NP_001272425; NP_001272426; NP_034953
Location (UCSC)	Chr 1: 43.34 – 43.35 Mb	Chr 4: 118.3 – 118.31 Mb
PubMed search
- Wikidata
View/Edit Human	View/Edit Mouse

The thrombopoietin receptor also known as the myeloproliferative leukemia protein or CD110 (Cluster of Differentiation 110) is a protein that in humans is encoded by the MPL (myeloproliferative leukemia virus) oncogene.

== Discovery ==
In 1990 an oncogene, v-mpl, was identified from the murine myeloproliferative leukemia virus that was capable of immortalizing bone marrow hematopoietic cells from different lineages. In 1992 the human homologue, named, c-mpl, was cloned. Sequence data revealed that c-mpl encoded a protein that was homologous with members of the hematopoietic receptor superfamily. Presence of anti-sense oligodeoxynucleotides of c-mpl inhibited megakaryocyte colony formation.

== Structure ==
The protein encoded by the c-mpl gene, CD110, is a 635 amino acid transmembrane domain, with two extracellular cytokine receptor domains and two intracellular cytokine receptor box motifs . TPO-R deficient mice were severely thrombocytopenic, emphasizing the important role of CD110 and thrombopoietin in megakaryocyte and platelet formation. Upon binding of thrombopoietin, CD110 is dimerized and the JAK family of non-receptor tyrosine kinases, as well as the STAT family, the MAPK family, the adaptor protein Shc and the receptors themselves become tyrosine phosphorylated.

== Function ==
Receptor for thrombopoietin which is the major regulator of megakaryocytopoiesis and platelet formation.

== Interactions ==
Myeloproliferative leukemia virus oncogene has been shown to interact with:

- ATXN2L
- JAK2
- thrombopoietin
- mutant calreticulin

== Clinical relevance ==
Inactivating mutations in this gene have been shown to cause familial aplastic anemia.

Specific mutations to this gene are associated with myelofibrosis and essential thrombocythemia. In essential thrombocythemia, mutations occur at position 505 or 515 in the protein. In myelofibrosis, a mutation occurs at position 515. These mutations lead to the production of thrombopoietin receptors that are permanently activated, which results in the overproduction of abnormal megakaryocytes.

== See also ==
- Cluster of differentiation
- Congenital amegakaryocytic thrombocytopenia
