= Thrombocytopenia =

Abnormally low levels of platelets in the blood

- Other names: Thrombocytopaenia, thrombopenia
- A photomicrograph of the blood showing thrombocytopenia
- Specialty: Hematology
- Causes: Bone marrow not making enough platelets, body destroying platelets, spleen holding too many platelets
- Diagnostic method: Complete blood count
- Treatment: None, immunosuppressants, platelet transfusion, surgical removal of the spleen

In hematology, thrombocytopenia is a condition characterized by abnormally low levels of platelets (also known as thrombocytes) in the blood. Low levels of platelets in turn may lead to prolonged or excessive bleeding. It is the most common coagulation disorder among intensive care patients and is seen in a fifth of medical patients and a third of surgical patients.

A normal human platelet count ranges from 150,000 to 450,000 platelets/microliter (μL) of blood. Values outside this range do not necessarily indicate disease. One common definition of thrombocytopenia requiring emergency treatment is a platelet count below 50,000/μL. Thrombocytopenia can be contrasted with the conditions associated with an abnormally high level of platelets in the blood – thrombocythemia (when the cause is unknown), and thrombocytosis (when the cause is known).

== Signs and symptoms ==
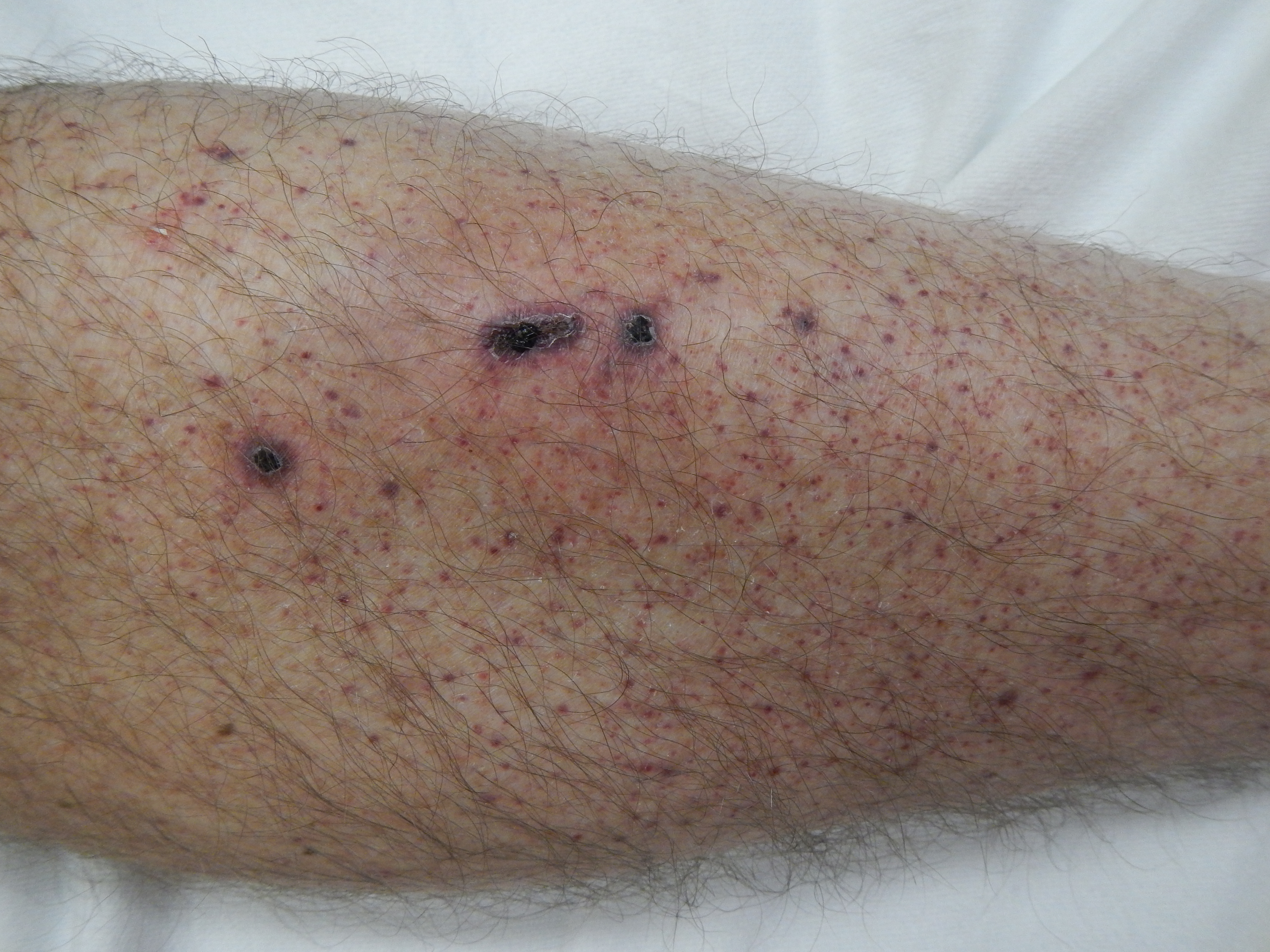
Petechiae on the lower leg from thrombocytopenia

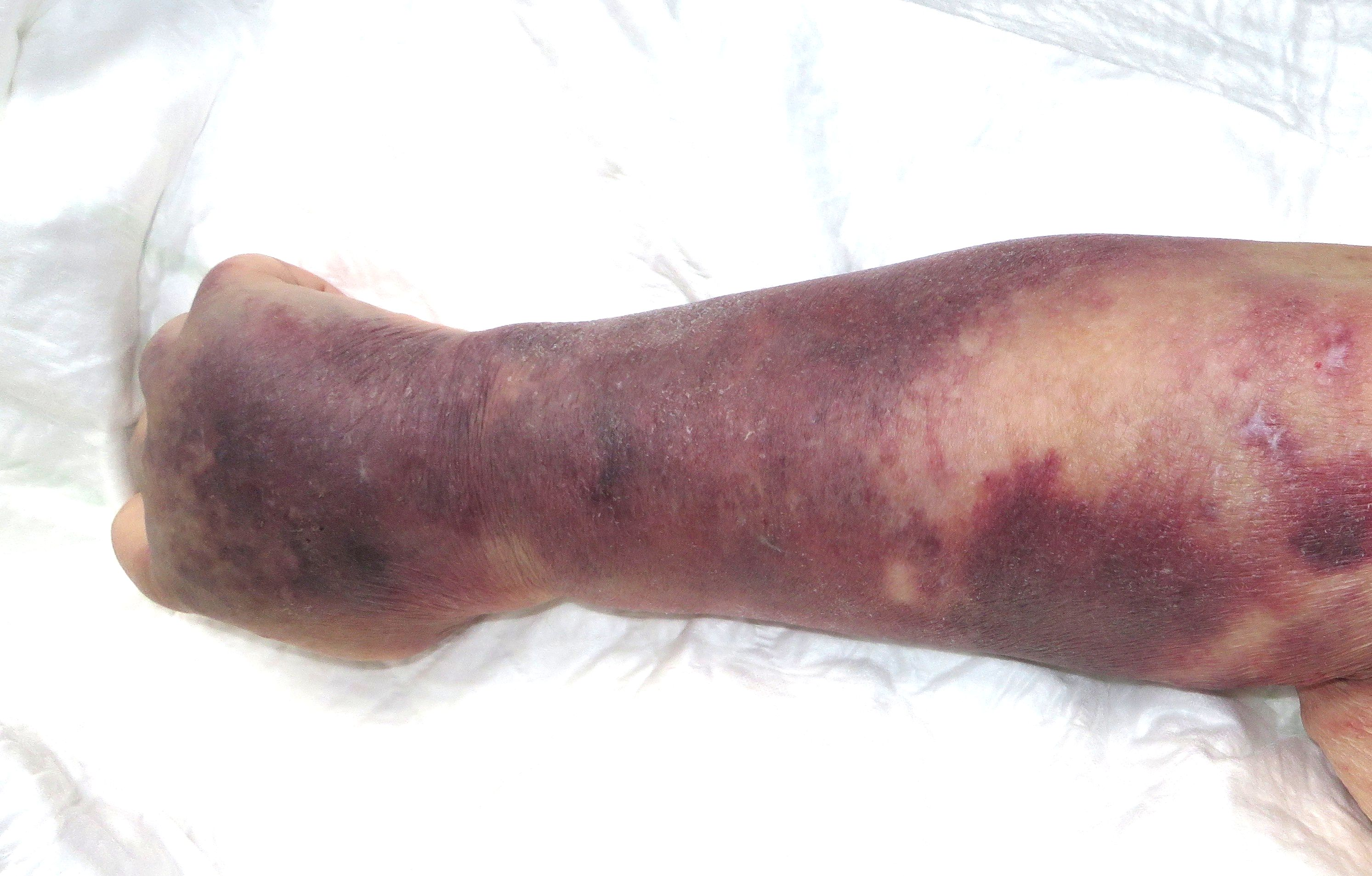
Right upper limb with purpura caused by thrombocytopenia in person with septic shock

Thrombocytopenia usually has no symptoms and is picked up on a routine complete blood count. Some individuals with thrombocytopenia may experience external bleeding, such as nosebleeds or bleeding gums. Some individuals may have heavier or longer periods or breakthrough bleeding. Bruising, particularly purpura in the forearms and petechiae in the feet, legs, and mucous membranes, may be caused by spontaneous bleeding under the skin.

Eliciting a full medical history is vital to ensure the low platelet count is not secondary to another disorder. Ensuring that the other blood cell types, such as red blood cells and white blood cells, are not also suppressed, is also important. Painless, round, and pinpoint (1 to 3 mm in diameter) petechiae usually appear and fade, and sometimes group to form ecchymoses. Larger than petechiae, ecchymoses are purple, blue, or yellow-green areas of skin that vary in size and shape. They can occur anywhere on the body.

A person with this disease may also complain of malaise, fatigue, and general weakness (with or without accompanying blood loss). Acquired thrombocytopenia may be associated with the use of certain drugs. Inspection typically reveals evidence of bleeding (petechiae or ecchymoses), along with slow, continuous bleeding from any injuries or wounds. Adults may have large, blood-filled bullae in the mouth. If the person's platelet count is between 30,000 and 50,000/μL, bruising with minor trauma may be expected; if it is between 15,000 and 30,000/μL, spontaneous bruising will be seen (mostly on the arms and legs).

== Causes ==
Thrombocytopenia can be inherited or acquired. There are many causes.

=== Decreased production ===
Abnormally low platelet production may be caused by:

- Dehydration, vitamin B_{12} or folic acid deficiency
- Leukemia, myelodysplastic syndrome, or aplastic anemia
- Decreased production of thrombopoietin by the liver in liver failure
- Sepsis, systemic viral or bacterial infection
- Leptospirosis
- Hereditary syndromes
  - ACTN1-related thrombocytopenia
  - Amegakaryocytic thrombocytopenia with radio-ulnar synostosis
  - ANKRD26 related thrombocytopenia
  - Autosomal dominant thrombocytopenia
  - Bernard–Soulier syndrome (associated with giant platelet disorder)
  - Congenital amegakaryocytic thrombocytopenia
  - Congenital amegakaryocytic thrombocytopenia and radioulnar synostosis
  - CYCS-related thrombocytopenia
  - Epstein syndrome (associated with giant platelet disorder)
  - ETV6 related thrombocytopenia
  - Fanconi anemia
  - Filaminopathies A
  - FYB related thrombocytopenia
  - Glanzmann's thrombasthenia
  - GNE myopathy with congenital thrombocytopenia
  - Gray platelet syndrome (associated with giant platelet disorder)
  - Harris platelet syndrome (associated with giant platelet disorder)
  - Macrothrombocytopenia and hearing loss
  - May–Hegglin anomaly (associated with giant platelet disorder)
  - MYH9-related disease (associated with giant platelet disorder)
  - PRKACG-related thrombocytopenia
  - Paris-Trousseau thrombocytopenia/Jacobsen syndrome
  - Sebastian syndrome
  - SLFN14-related thrombocytopenia
  - Stormorken syndrome
  - TRPM7-related thrombocytopenia
  - Thrombocytopenia absent radius syndrome
  - Tropomyosin 4-related thrombocytopenia
  - TUBB1-related thrombocytopenia
  - Upshaw–Schulman syndrome
  - Wiskott–Aldrich syndrome
  - X-linked thrombocytopenia
  - X-linked thrombocytopenia with thalassemia

=== Increased destruction ===
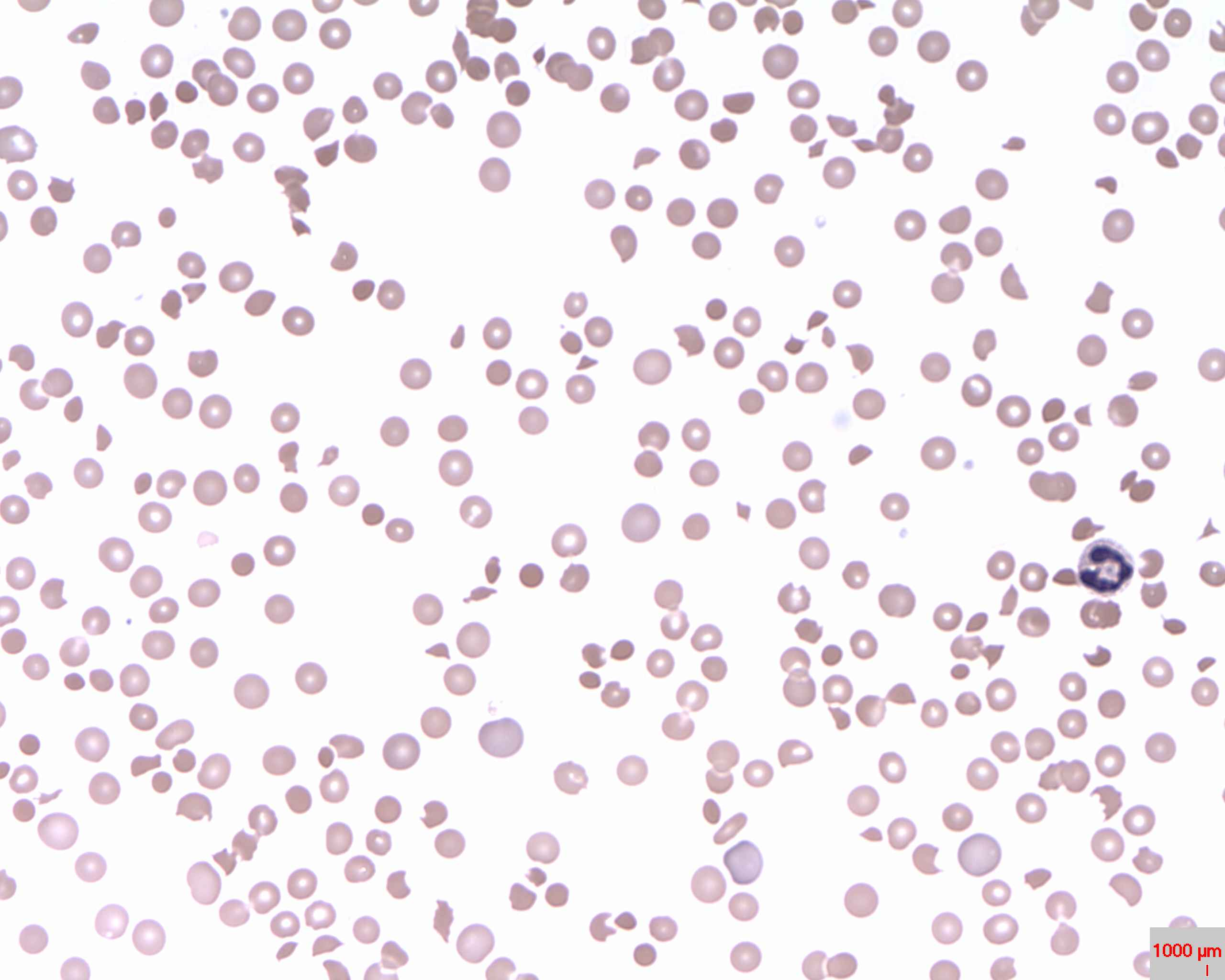
TTP

Abnormally high rates of platelet destruction may be due to immune or nonimmune conditions, including:

- Immune thrombocytopenic purpura
- Thrombotic thrombocytopenic purpura
- Hemolytic–uremic syndrome
- Disseminated intravascular coagulation
- Paroxysmal nocturnal hemoglobinuria
- Antiphospholipid syndrome
- Systemic lupus erythematosus
- Post-transfusion purpura
- Neonatal alloimmune thrombocytopenia
- Hypersplenism
- Dengue fever
- Gaucher's disease
- Zika virus

=== Medication-induced ===
These medications can induce thrombocytopenia through direct myelosuppression:

- Valproic acid
- Methotrexate
- Carboplatin
- Interferon
- Isotretinoin
- Panobinostat
- H_{2} blockers and proton-pump inhibitors

=== Other causes ===
- Laboratory error, possibly due to the anticoagulant EDTA in CBC specimen tubes; a citrated platelet count is a useful follow-up study
- Snakebite
- Lyme disease
- Thrombocytapheresis (also called plateletpheresis)
- Niemann–Pick disease
- Cyclic thrombocytopenia, in which platelet counts vary in a cyclic pattern

== Diagnosis ==
Laboratory tests for thrombocytopenia might include full blood count, liver enzymes, kidney function, vitamin B_{12} levels, folic acid levels, erythrocyte sedimentation rate, and peripheral blood smear. If the cause for the low platelet count remains unclear, a bone marrow biopsy is usually recommended to differentiate cases of decreased platelet production from cases of peripheral platelet destruction.

Thrombocytopenia in hospitalized alcoholics may be caused by spleen enlargement, folate deficiency, and most frequently, the direct toxic effect of alcohol on production, survival time, and function of platelets. Platelet count begins to rise after 2 to 5 days' abstinence from alcohol. The condition is generally benign, and clinically significant hemorrhage is rare.

In severe thrombocytopenia, a bone marrow study can determine the number, size, and maturity of the megakaryocytes. This information may identify ineffective platelet production as the cause of thrombocytopenia and rule out a malignant disease process at the same time.

== Treatment ==
Treatment is guided by the severity and specific cause of the disease. Treatment focuses on eliminating the underlying problem, whether that means discontinuing drugs suspected to cause it or treating underlying sepsis. Diagnosis and treatment of serious thrombocytopenia is usually directed by a hematologist. Corticosteroids may be used to increase platelet production. Lithium carbonate or folate may also be used to stimulate platelet production in the bone marrow.

=== Platelet transfusions ===
Platelet transfusions may be suggested for people who have a low platelet count due to thrombocytopenia.

=== Thrombotic thrombocytopenic purpura ===
Treatment of thrombotic thrombocytopenic purpura (TTP) is a medical emergency, since the associated hemolytic anemia and platelet activation can lead to kidney failure and changes in the level of consciousness. Treatment of TTP was revolutionized in the 1980s with the application of plasmapheresis. According to the Furlan–Tsai hypothesis, this treatment works by removing antibodies against the von Willebrand factor-cleaving protease ADAMTS-13. The plasmapheresis procedure also adds active ADAMTS-13 protease proteins to the patient, restoring a normal level of von Willebrand factor multimers. Patients with persistent antibodies against ADAMTS-13 do not always manifest TTP, and these antibodies alone are not sufficient to explain how plasmapheresis treats TTP.

=== Immune thrombocytopenic purpura ===
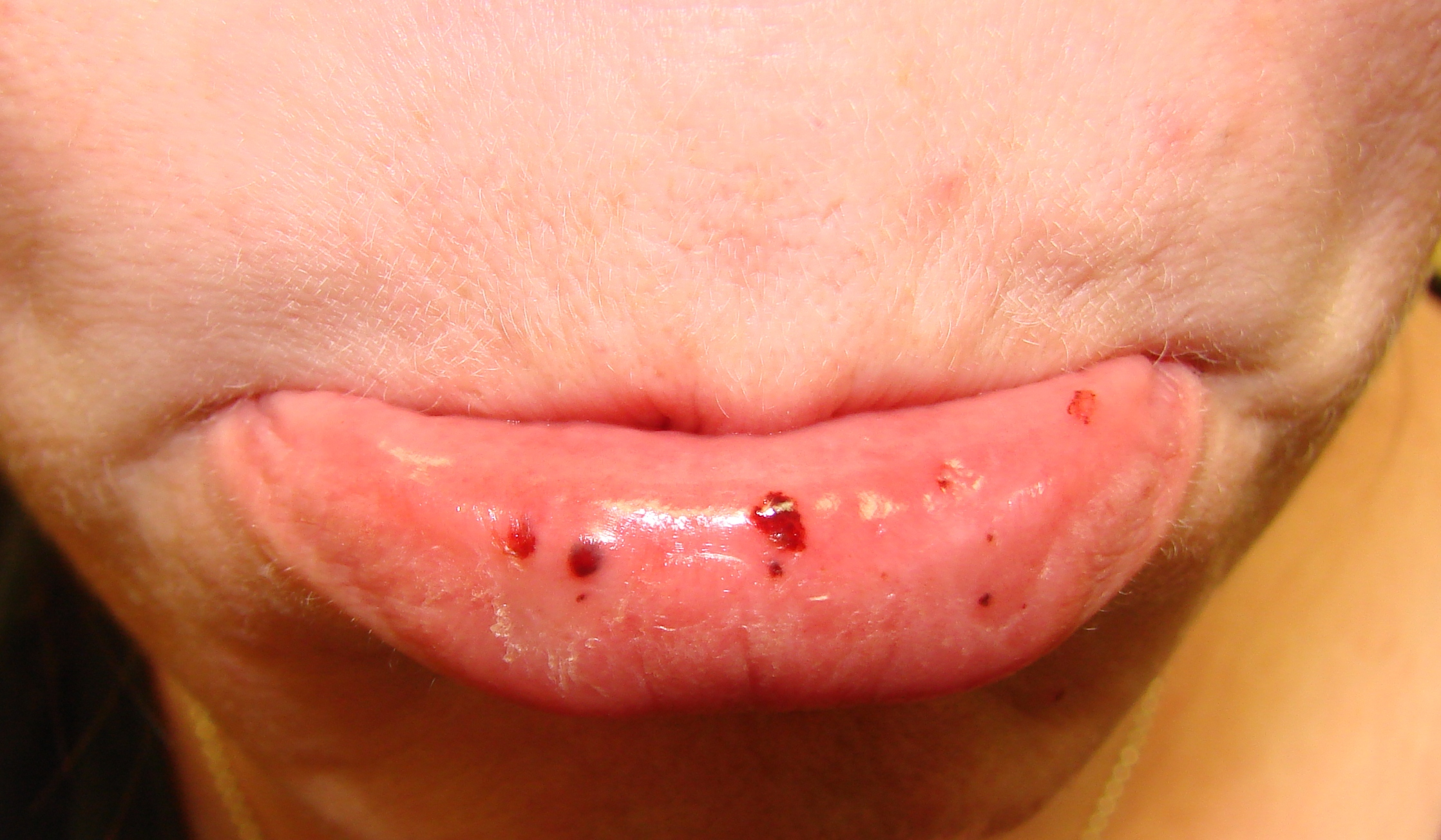
Oral petechiae/purpura - immune thrombocytopenic purpura

Many cases of immune thrombocytopenic purpura (ITP), also known as idiopathic thrombocytopenic purpura, can be left untreated, and spontaneous remission (especially in children) is not uncommon. However, counts under 50,000/μL are usually monitored with regular blood tests, and those with counts under 10,000/μL are usually treated, as the risk of serious spontaneous bleeding is high with such low platelet counts. Any patient experiencing severe bleeding symptoms is also usually treated. The threshold for treating ITP has decreased since the 1990s; hematologists recognize that patients rarely spontaneously bleed with platelet counts greater than 10,000/μL, although exceptions to this observation have been documented.

Thrombopoetin analogues have been tested extensively for the treatment of ITP. These agents had previously shown promise, but had been found to stimulate antibodies against endogenous thrombopoietin or lead to thrombosis. Romiplostim (trade name Nplate, formerly AMG 531) was found to be safe and effective for the treatment of ITP in refractory patients, especially those who relapsed following splenectomy.

=== Heparin-induced thrombocytopenia ===
Discontinuation of heparin is critical in a case of heparin-induced thrombocytopenia (HIT). Beyond that, however, clinicians generally treat to avoid thrombosis. Treatment may include a direct thrombin inhibitor, such as lepirudin or argatroban. Other "blood thinners" sometimes used in this setting include bivalirudin and fondaparinux. Platelet transfusions are not routinely used to treat HIT because thrombosis, not bleeding, is the primary problem. Warfarin is not recommended until platelets have normalized.

=== Congenital amegakaryocytic thrombocytopenia ===
Bone marrow/stem cell transplants are the only known cures for this genetic disease. Frequent platelet transfusions are required to keep the patient from bleeding to death before the transplant can be performed, although this is not always the case.

=== Human-induced pluripotent stem cell-derived platelets ===
Human-induced pluripotent stem cell-derived platelets is a technology currently being researched by the private sector, in association with the Biomedical Advanced Research and Development Authority and the U.S. Department of Health and Human Services, that would create platelets outside the human body.

== Neonatal thrombocytopenia ==
Thrombocytopenia affects a few newborns, and its prevalence in neonatal intensive care units is high. Normally, it is mild and resolves without consequences. Most cases affect preterm birth infants and result from placental insufficiency and/or fetal hypoxia. Other causes, such as alloimmunity, genetics, autoimmunity, and infection, are less frequent.

Thrombocytopenia that starts after the first 72 hours, since birth is often the result of underlying sepsis or necrotizing enterocolitis. In the case of infection, polymerase chain reaction tests may be useful for rapid pathogen identification and detection of antibiotic-resistance genes. Possible pathogens include viruses (e.g. cytomegalovirus, rubella virus, HIV), bacteria (e.g. Staphylococcus spp., Enterococcus spp., Streptococcus agalactiae, Listeria monocytogenes, Escherichia coli, Haemophilus influenzae, Klebsiella pneumoniae, Pseudomonas aeruginosa, Yersinia enterocolitica), fungi (e.g. Candida spp.), and Toxoplasma gondii. The severity of thrombocytopenia may be correlated with pathogen type; some research indicates that the most severe cases are related to fungal or Gram-negative bacterial infection. The pathogen may be transmitted during or before birth, by breast feeding, or during transfusion. Interleukin-11 is being investigated as a drug for managing thrombocytopenia, especially in cases of sepsis or necrotizing enterocolitis.
