= Congenital amegakaryocytic thrombocytopenia =

- Other names: CAMT
- Congenital amegakaryocytic thrombocytopenia is inherited in an Autosomal Recessive manner.
- Specialty: Hematology
- Symptoms: Thrombocytopenia, petechiae, purpura, and gastrointestinal, pulmonary or intracranial hemorrhages.
- Complications: Bone marrow failure, aplastic anemia, and pancytopenia.
- Usual onset: Birth.
- Duration: Lifelong.
- Types: Type I and type II.
- Causes: Genetic mutations.
- Diagnostic method: Bone marrow biopsy and genetic testing.
- Differential diagnosis: Thrombocytopenia-absent radius syndrome and Wiskott-Aldrich syndrome.
- Treatment: Platelet transfusions and hematopoietic stem cell transplantation.
- Prognosis: 30% die from complications of bleeding and 20% die from complications associated with hematopoietic stem cell transplantation.
- Frequency: Less than 100 cases have been reported.

Congenital amegakaryocytic thrombocytopenia (CAMT) is a rare autosomal recessive bone marrow failure syndrome characterized by severe thrombocytopenia, which can progress to aplastic anemia and leukemia. CAMT usually manifests as thrombocytopenia in the initial month of life or in the fetal phase. Typically CAMPT presents with petechiae, cerebral bleeds, recurrent rectal bleeding, or pulmonary hemorrhage.

The cause of CAMT is believed to be mutations in the MPL gene coding for thrombopoietin receptor, which is expressed in pluripotent hematopoietic stem cells and cells of the megakaryocyte lineage.

CAMT is diagnosed by a bone marrow biopsy and is often initially suspected to be fetal and neonatal alloimmune thrombocytopenia. Two types of Congenital amegakaryocytic thrombocytopenia have been identified with type I being more severe.

Treatment is mostly supportive, consisting of multiple platelet transfusions. Hematopoietic stem cell transplantation is the only known cure for CAMT.

Once pancytopenia develops, the prognosis is poor. Studies have shown 30% of CAMT patients die from bleeding complications, and another 20% die from complications related to hematopoietic stem cell transplantation.

== Signs and symptoms ==
Congenital amegakaryocytic thrombocytopenia manifests itself at birth, typically within the first few days of birth. Thrombocytopenia and a near absence of megakaryocytes in the bone marrow cause petechiae, purpura, and gastrointestinal, pulmonary or intracranial hemorrhage.

Less common symptoms of CAMPT include cardiac defects such as atrial and ventricular septal defects, cerebral and cerebellar hypoplasia, and delayed psychomotor development.

=== Complications ===
Those with type I Congenital amegakaryocytic thrombocytopenia often progress to bone marrow failure and aplastic anemia around age 1, while those with type II usually don't develop bone marrow failure or aplastic anemia till age 5. About 90% of those with type II CAMT develop pancytopenia. Rates of pancytopenia are much lower in type I. Increased risk of myelodysplastic syndrome and acute myeloid leukemia has been associated with Congenital amegakaryocytic thrombocytopenia.

== Cause ==
Congenital amegakaryocytic thrombocytopenia is most likely caused by a mutation in the gene for the TPO receptor, c-mpl, despite high levels of serum TPO. In addition, there may be abnormalities with the central nervous system including the cerebrum and cerebellum which could cause symptoms.

== Diagnosis ==
The main diagnostic features of Congenital amegakaryocytic thrombocytopenia are elevated serum TPO levels that do not respond to TPO stimulation, absent or very few megakaryocytes in bone marrow, and thrombocytopenia that worsens with age. Congenital amegakaryocytic thrombocytopenia is confirmed by homozygous or compound heterozygous mutations in the c-Mpl gene.

The differential diagnosis for Congenital amegakaryocytic thrombocytopenia includes thrombocytopenia-absent radius syndrome and Wiskott-Aldrich syndrome. Congenital amegakaryocytic thrombocytopenia is distinguished from thrombocytopenia-absent radius syndrome on the basis of skeletal hypoplasia in the arms. The absence of microthrombocytopenia can rule out Wiskott-Aldrich syndrome.

=== Classification ===
Two types of Congenital amegakaryocytic thrombocytopenia have been identified. Type I-CAMT is more severe and is characterized by low platelet counts and an early progression of bone marrow aplasia associated with pancytopenia.

The second type of Congenital amegakaryocytic thrombocytopenia is milder and presents with a transient increase of platelet counts during the first year of life. Those with type II-CAMT often don't develop pancytopenia and if they do it tends to develop later than in type I.

== Treatment ==
Bone marrow transplant is the only thing that cures Congenital amegakaryocytic thrombocytopenia. Frequent platelet transfusions are required to ensure that platelet levels do not fall to dangerous levels, although this is not always the case. It is known for patients to continue to create very small numbers of platelets over time.

== Outlook ==
Although hematopoietic stem cell transplantation has been shown to cure Congenital amegakaryocytic thrombocytopenia, the association of early bone marrow aplasia worsens prognosis. About 30% of those with CAMT die from complications of bleeding and a further 20% die from complications associated with hematopoietic stem cell transplantation.

== Epidemiology ==
Less than 100 cases of Congenital amegakaryocytic thrombocytopenia have been reported, although the incidence of CAMT is most likely underestimated because isolated CAMT may be misdiagnosed as neonatal alloimmune thrombocytopenia. There is a slight female in preponderance in CAMT.

== See also ==
- Thrombocytopenia
- Megakaryocyte
