= Bone marrow failure =

Organ dysfunction

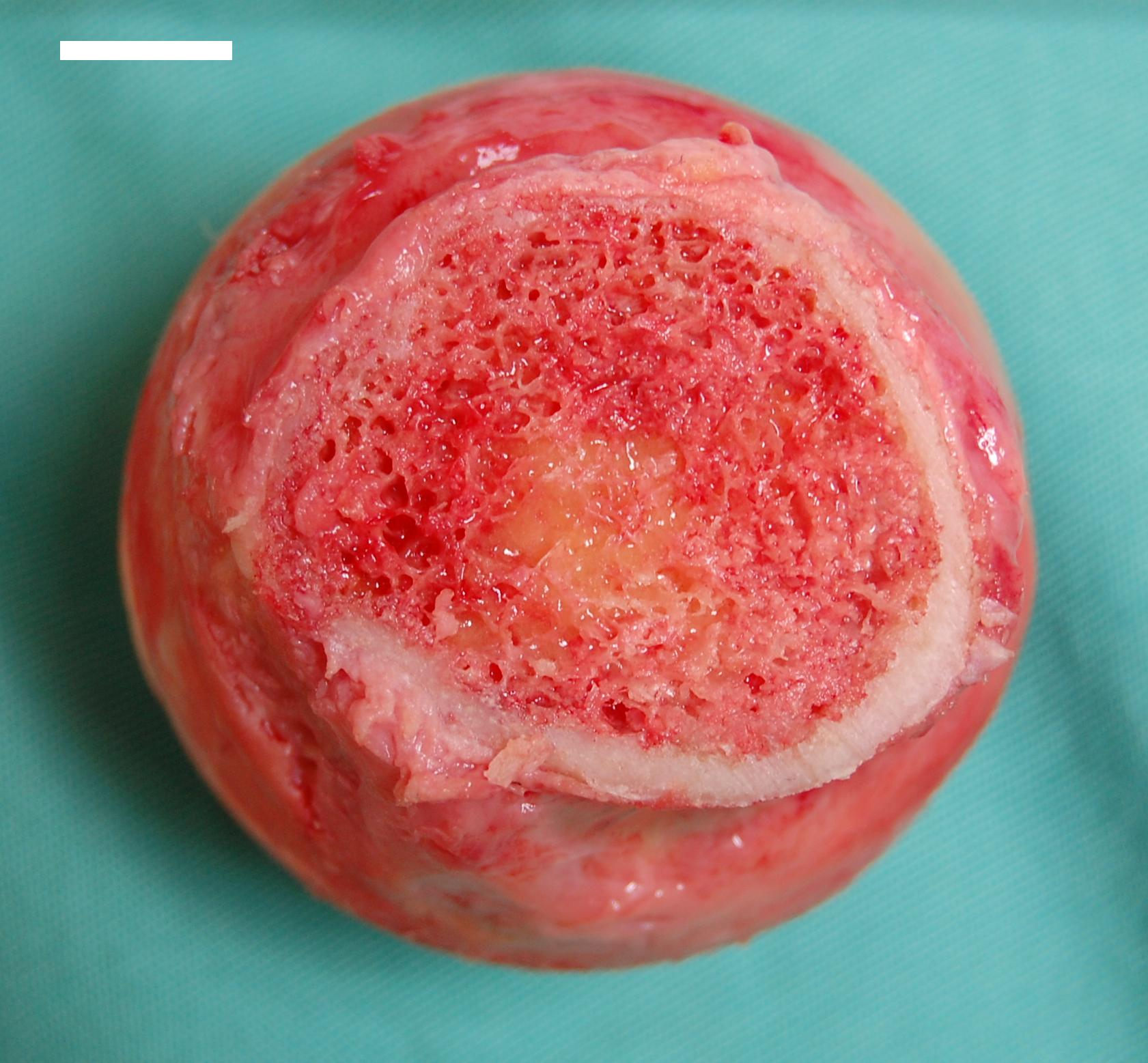
Section through the head of a femur, showing the cortex, the red bone marrow, and a spot of yellow bone marrow in the middle.

Bone marrow failure occurs in individuals who produce an insufficient amount of red blood cells, white blood cells or platelets. Red blood cells transport oxygen to be distributed throughout the body's tissue. White blood cells fight off infections that enter the body. Bone marrow progenitor cells known as megakaryocytes produce platelets, which trigger clotting, and thus help stop the blood flow when a wound occurs.

== Signs and symptoms ==
The two most common signs and symptoms of bone marrow failure are bleeding and bruising. Blood may be seen throughout the gums, nose or the skin, and bleeding tends to last longer than normal. Children have a greater chance of seeing blood in their urine or stools. Individuals with this condition may also encounter tooth loss or tooth decay. Chronic fatigue, shortness of breath, and recurrent infections can also be symptoms of bone marrow failure.

== Causes ==
Bone marrow failure in both children and adults can be either inherited or acquired. Inherited bone marrow failure is often the cause in young children, while older children and adults may acquire the disease later in life. Acquired bone marrow failure may be due to aplastic anemia or myelodysplastic syndrome.

== Inherited bone marrow failure syndromes ==
Inherited marrow failure syndromes include:

- Ribosomopathies such as Shwachman-Diamond syndrome
- Telomeropathies such as Dyskeratosis congenita
- Severe Congenital Neutropenia
- Fanconi anemia
- MECOM deficiency
- Amegakaryocytic thrombocytopenia
- Diamond Blackfan anemia
- MIRAGE syndrome (myelodysplasia, infections, restriction of growth, adrenal hypoplasia, genital phenotypes and enteropathy)
- Thrombocytopenia with absent radii (TAR syndrome)

Fanconi anemia is an inherited blood disorder due to abnormal breakages in DNA genes. It is linked to hyperpigmentation, which is the darkening of an area of skin or nails caused by increased melanin, though in about 30% of FA patients no physical abnormalities are found.

Dyskeratosis congenita often affects multiple parts of the body. Individuals with this disorder usually show changes in skin pigmentations, unusual fingernail growth, and mucosa leukoplakia; the inner part of the mouth is encased with white patches.

Inherited bone marrow failure syndromes represent a kind of premature aging of the bone marrow. In patients with these syndromes, as in elderly patients, mutations associated with clonal hematopoiesis may arise as an adaptive response to a progressively deteriorating hematopoietic niche, i.e., a depleting pool of Hematopoietic stem cells. The mutated stem cells then acquire a self-renewal advantage.

== Acquired bone marrow failure ==
Aplastic anemia is an acquired autoimmune disease in which T cells attack and destroy bone marrow precursor cells.

Myelodysplastic syndrome (MDS) is a form of blood cancer in which the bone marrow no longer produces enough healthy, normal blood cells. MDS are a frequently unrecognized and rare group of bone marrow failure disorders, yet the incidence rate has risen from 143 reported cases in 1973 to approximately 15,000 cases in the United States each year. MDS is likely under-diagnosed, with the believed actual incidence rate estimated at 35,000 to 55,000 new cases annually. One in three people with MDS progress to acute myeloid leukemia. For lower risk patients, those who do not undergo a bone marrow transplant have an average survival time of up to six years. However, high-risk patients have a survival rate of approximately five months.

== Diagnosis ==
Cytopenias may be noted in the peripheral blood. Bone marrow examination is required to assess erythroid, myeloid and megakaryocytic precursors, identify genetic abnormalities, and rule out other entities such as leukemia. B-cell lymphopenia has been observed in some patients with MECOM deficiency but is not a definitive indicator.

== Epidemiology ==
For those with severe bone marrow failure, the cumulative incidence of resulting stem cell transplantation or death was greater than 70% by individuals 60 years of age. The incidence of bone marrow failure is triphasic: one peak at two to five years during childhood (due to inherited causes), and two peaks in adulthood, between 20 and 25 years old and after 60 years old (from acquired causes).

One in ten individuals with bone marrow failure have unsuspected Fanconi anemia (FA). FA is the most common inherited bone marrow failure with an incidence of one to five episodes per million individuals. The carrier frequency for FA is 1 in 200 to 300, however this differs by ethnicity. In Europe and North America, the incidence of acquired aplastic anemia is rare with two episodes per million people each year, yet in Asia rises with 3.9 to 7.4 episodes per million people each year. While acquired aplastic anemia with an unknown cause is rare, it is commonly permanent and life-threatening as half of those with this condition die within the first six months.

The prevalence of bone marrow failure is over three times higher in Japan and East Asia than in the United States and Europe. When one's body fails to produce blood cell lines, the morbidity and mortality rate increases.

== Treatment ==
Supportive care with blood transfusions including platelets should be provided for symptoms of anemia and bleeding. Inherited bone marrow failure syndromes may require hematopoietic stem cell transplantation. Depending on severity, aplastic anemia may be treated with T-cell suppression in the form of cyclosporine and anti-thymocyte globulin, or may require hematopoietic stem cell transplantation.
