= MYH9 =

Mammalian protein found in Homo sapiens

Identifiers
- Aliases: MYH9, BDPLT6, DFNA17, EPSTS, FTNS, MHA, NMHC-II-A, NMMHC-IIA, NMMHCA, myosin, heavy chain 9, non-muscle, myosin heavy chain 9, MATINS
- External IDs: OMIM: 160775; MGI: 107717; GeneCards: MYH9
Available structures
PDB	Ortholog search: PDBe RCSB
PDB	List of PDB id codes 2LNK, 3ZWH, 4CFQ, 4CFR, 4ETO

Gene location (Human)
Chr.	Chromosome 22 (human)
Band	22q12.3	Start	36,281,280 bp
Band	22q12.3	End	36,388,010 bp

Gene location (Mouse)
Chr.	Chromosome 15 (mouse)
Band	15 E1|15 36.81 cM	Start	77,644,787 bp
Band	15 E1|15 36.81 cM	End	77,726,375 bp
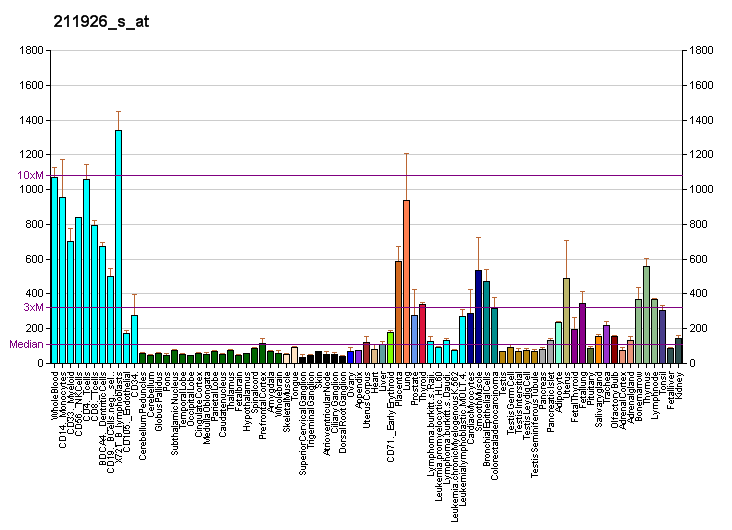
RNA expression pattern
Bgee	Human / Mouse (ortholog); Top expressed in: ascending aorta; stromal cell of endometrium; Descending thoracic aorta; right coronary artery; popliteal artery; tibial arteries; body of uterus; epithelium of colon; right lung; left coronary artery / Top expressed in: aortic valve; ascending aorta; right lung lobe; tibiofemoral joint; external carotid artery; internal carotid artery; granulocyte; Gonadal ridge; medullary collecting duct; blood; More reference expression data
BioGPS	More reference expression data
Gene ontology
Molecular function	protein homodimerization activity; nucleotide binding; microfilament motor activity; protein binding; ADP binding; protein-membrane adaptor activity; calmodulin binding; ATPase activity; protein domain specific binding; actin binding; cytoskeletal motor activity; ATP binding; RNA binding; cadherin binding; actin filament binding; microtubule motor activity; microtubule binding
Cellular component	myosin II filament; cell cortex; brush border; actomyosin; myosin complex; integrin complex; ruffle; nucleus; cell leading edge; actomyosin contractile ring; cytoskeleton; cleavage furrow; cortical cytoskeleton; actin cytoskeleton; spindle; membrane; COP9 signalosome; extracellular exosome; neuromuscular junction; cytoplasm; cytosol; focal adhesion; plasma membrane; stress fiber; uropod; immunological synapse; myosin II complex; extracellular matrix
Biological process	in utero embryonic development; protein transport; monocyte differentiation; uropod organization; cell adhesion; cell morphogenesis involved in differentiation; platelet formation; leukocyte migration; establishment of meiotic spindle localization; blood vessel endothelial cell migration; establishment of T cell polarity; myoblast fusion; membrane protein ectodomain proteolysis; actomyosin structure organization; angiogenesis; integrin-mediated signaling pathway; actin cytoskeleton reorganization; regulation of cell shape; actin filament-based movement; platelet aggregation; meiotic spindle organization; phagocytosis, engulfment; negative regulation of actin filament severing; positive regulation of protein processing in phagocytic vesicle; cytokinetic process; cell-cell adhesion; microtubule-based movement
Sources:Amigo / QuickGO
Orthologs
Databases	NCBI: entry; OMA: entry
Species	Human	Mouse
Entrez	4627	17886
Ensembl	ENSG00000100345	ENSMUSG00000022443
UniProt	P35579; Q5BKV1	Q8VDD5
RefSeq (mRNA)	NM_002473	NM_022410
RefSeq (protein)	NP_002464; NP_002464.1	NP_071855
Location (UCSC)	Chr 22: 36.28 – 36.39 Mb	Chr 15: 77.64 – 77.73 Mb
PubMed search
- Wikidata
View/Edit Human	View/Edit Mouse

Myosin-9 also known as myosin, heavy chain 9, non-muscle or non-muscle myosin heavy chain IIa (NMMHC-IIA) is a protein which in humans is encoded by the MYH9 gene.

Non-muscle myosin IIA (NM IIA) is expressed in most cells and tissues where it participates in a variety of processes requiring contractile force, such as cytokinesis, cell migration, polarization and adhesion, maintenance of cell shape, and signal transduction. Myosin IIs are motor proteins that are part of a superfamily composed of more than 30 classes. Class II myosins include muscle and non-muscle myosins that are organized as hexameric molecules consisting of two heavy chains (230 kDa), two regulatory light chains (20 KDa) controlling the myosin activity, and two essential light chains (17 kDa), which stabilize the heavy chain structure.

== Gene ==
MYH9 is a large gene spanning more than 106 kilo base pairs on chromosome 22q12.3. It is composed of 41 exons with the first ATG of the open reading frame localized in exon 2 and the stop codon in exon 41. It encodes non-muscle myosin heavy chain IIA (NMHC IIA), a protein of 1,960 amino acids. Consistent with its wide expression in cells and tissues, the promoter region of MYH9 is typical of housekeeping genes having no TATA box but high GC content, with multiple GC boxes. MYH9 is a well-conserved gene through evolution. The mouse ortholog (Myh9) is localized in a syntenic region on chromosome 15 and has the same genomic organization as that of the human gene. It encodes a protein of the same length, with 97.1% amino acid identity with the human MYH9 protein.

== Tissue distribution ==
There are significant differences in the relative abundance of the three NM II paralogs in various cells and tissues. However, NM IIA appears to be the predominant paralog in both tissues and cells in humans and mice. Mass spectroscopy analysis of the relative abundance of NMHC IIs in mouse tissues and human cell lines shows that NM IIA is predominant, although tissues like the heart vary from cell to cell; myocardial cells contain only NM IIB but NM IIA is more abundant in the non-myocyte cells. NM IIB is predominant in most parts of the brain and spinal cord but NM IIA is relatively more abundant in most other organs and cells lines. Both NM IIA and IIB are expressed early in development with NM IIC expression starting at E 11.5 in mice. Not only do most cells contain more than one paralog but there is evidence that the paralogs can co-assemble intracellularly into heterotypic filaments in a variety of settings in cultured cells.

== Structure ==
Like all class II myosins, the two NMHC IIAs dimerize producing an asymmetric molecular structure recognizable by two heads and a tail domain: the N-terminal half of each heavy chain generates the head domain, which consists of the globular motor domain and the neck domain, and the C-terminal halves of the two heavy chains together form the tail domain. The motor domain, which is organized into four subdomains (SH3-like motif, the upper and the lower 50kDa subdomains, and the converter region) connected by flexible linkers, interacts with filamentous actin to generate force through magnesium-dependent hydrolysis of ATP. The neck acts as a lever arm that amplifies the movement produced by conformational changes of the motor domain, and is the binding site for the light chains through two IQ motifs. The tail domain is fundamental for both dimerization of the heavy chains and formation of NM IIA functional filaments. Two heavy chains dimerize through the tail domain forming a long alpha-helical coiled-coil rod composed of typical heptad repeats. Dimers self-associate though the coiled-coil rods to form myosin filaments. The tail domain ends at the C-terminus with a 34-residue non-helical tailpiece.

== Function ==
NM IIA plays a major role in early vertebrate development. Ablation of NM IIA in mice results in lethality by embryonic day (E) 6.5 due to abnormalities in the visceral endoderm which is disorganized due to a loss of E-cadherin mediated cell-cell adhesions. Lacking a normal polarized columnar layer of endoderm, the abnormal visceral endoderm of NM IIA knockout embryos fails to support the critical step of gastrulation. However, the development of a normal functioning visceral endoderm does not specifically depend on NM IIA since its function can be restored by genetically replacing the NMHC IIA with cDNA encoding NMHC II B (or NMHC IIC) that is under control of the NMHC IIA promoter. These "replacement" mice have a normal visceral endoderm and continue to proceed through gastrulation and undergo organogenesis. However, they die when they fail to develop a normal placenta. Absence of NM IIA results in a compact and underdeveloped labyrinthine layer in the placenta which lacks fetal blood vessel invasion. Moreover, mutant p.R702C NM IIA mice show similar defects in placental formation and mice specifically ablated for NM IIA in the mouse trophoblast-lineage cells demonstrate placental defects similar to mice in which NMHC IIA is genetically replaced by NMHC IIB.

== Regulation ==
There are three paralogs of non-muscle myosin II (NM II), NM IIA, IIB, and IIC, with each having the heavy chain encoded on a different chromosome. All three paralogs appear to bind the same or very similar light chains and share basic properties as to structure and activation, but all three play distinct roles during vertebrate development and adulthood (for general reviews on NM IIs, see). All NM IIs have two important features: they are MgATPase enzymes that can hydrolyze ATP thereby converting chemical energy into mechanical movement. In addition, they can form bipolar filaments which can interact with and exert tension on actin filaments. These properties provide the basis for all NM II functions. The path to myosin filament formation, which is shared by NM II and smooth muscle myosin, starts with a folded inactive conformation of the NM II monomer which, upon phosphorylation of the 20 KDa light chain unfolds the molecule to produce a globular head region followed by an extended alpha-helical coiled-coil tail. The tail portion of the molecule can interact with other NM IIA hexamers to form bipolar filaments composed of 14-16 molecules.

Phosphorylation of the 20 KDa light chains on Serine 19 and Threonine 18 by a number of different kinases, but most prominently by Rho-dependent kinase and/or by the calcium-calmodulin-dependent myosin light chain kinase, not only linearizes the folded structure but removes the inhibition imposed on the MgATPase activity due to the folded conformation. In addition to phosphorylation of the 20 KDa light chains, the NMHC IIs can also be phosphorylated, but the sites phosphorylated differ among the paralogs. In most cases phosphorylation of NMHC IIA can act to either dissociate the myosin filaments or to prevent filament formation.

In addition to phosphorylation, NM IIA filament assembly and localization can be modulated by interaction with other proteins including S100A4 and Lethal giant larvae (Lgl1). The former is a calcium binding protein and is also known as metastatin, a well-characterized metastatic factor. S100A4 expression is associated with enhanced cell migration through maintenance of cell polarization and inhibition of cell turning. Similar to heavy chain phosphorylation, in vitro binding of S100A to the carboxy-terminal end of the NM IIA coiled-coil region prevents filament formation and S100A4 binding to previously formed filaments promotes filament disassembly. The tumor suppressor protein Lgl1 also inhibits the ability of NM IIA to assemble into filaments in vitro. In addition, it regulates the cellular localization of NM IIA and contributes to the maturation of focal adhesions. Other proteins that are known to interact with NM IIA include the actin binding protein tropomyosin 4.2 and a novel actin stress fiber associated protein, LIM and calponin-homology domains1 (LIMCH1).

== Clinical significance ==
=== MYH9-RD ===
Mutations in MYH9 cause a Mendelian autosomal dominant disorder known as MYH9-related disease (MYH9-RD). The disease encompasses four syndromic variants that were historically considered distinct—May-Hegglin anomaly, Sebastian syndrome, Fechtner syndrome, and Epstein syndrome—but are now recognized as variable clinical presentations of the same condition. MYH9-RD is a rare disorder with an estimated prevalence of 3 per 1,000,000. However, actual prevalence is likely higher due to underdiagnosis of mild or asymptomatic cases. The disease has been reported globally, with no apparent ethnic variation.

==== Clinical features ====
All patients present with congenital thrombocytopenia and giant platelets. Blood smears consistently show platelets larger than red blood cells. Granulocytes contain cytoplasmic inclusions of the MYH9 protein (NMHC IIA), appearing as Döhle-like bodies on conventional staining. Bleeding tendency is variable. Most individuals have no spontaneous bleeding or only mild symptoms (e.g., bruising). Severe hemorrhage is uncommon and usually provoked by trauma, surgery, or childbirth. Some patients experience mucosal bleeding, such as menorrhagia, epistaxis, or gingival bleeding.

More than 50% of patients develop sensorineural hearing loss. Severity is highly variable, ranging from mild, late-onset impairment to early-onset progressive deafness. Renal involvement affects about 25% of patients and typically begins with proteinuria, sometimes progressing to renal failure requiring dialysis or transplantation. Approximately 20% develop presenile cataracts. Around 50% of patients have chronic or intermittent elevation of liver enzymes; this is generally benign and not associated with liver dysfunction.

==== Diagnosis ====
Diagnosis is confirmed by detecting cytoplasmic NMHC IIA inclusions in granulocytes via immunofluorescence on blood smears, or by identifying pathogenic variants in the MYH9 gene via molecular testing.

==== Genetics ====
MYH9-RD is typically caused by missense mutations affecting the head or tail domains of NMHC IIA. About 20% of cases involve nonsense or frameshift mutations that delete 17–40 residues at the C-terminus. In-frame deletions or duplications are rare. The disorder follows an autosomal dominant inheritance pattern. Nevertheless, approximately 35% of index cases are sporadic due to de novo mutations. Rarely, germline or somatic mosaicism is identified.

The severity and onset of non-congenital manifestations correlate with the specific MYH9 mutation. Genotype–phenotype relationships also extend to platelet count, platelet size, and inclusion characteristics.

==== Management ====
Treatment is primarily supportive. In a phase 2 trial, the thrombopoietin receptor agonist eltrombopag significantly increased platelet counts in 11 of 12 patients. Early use of ACE inhibitors or angiotensin receptor blockers may slow progression of renal disease by reducing proteinuria. For patients with severe or profound deafness, cochlear implantation has been shown to be safe and effective.

=== Cancer ===
Evidence obtained in animals indicates that MYH9 acts as a tumor suppressor gene. Silencing of Myh9 in the epithelial cells in mice was associated with the development of squamous cell carcinoma (SCC) of the skin and the head and neck. In another mouse model, ablation of Myh9 in the tongue epithelium led to the development of tongue SCC. In mice predisposed to invasive lobular breast carcinoma (ILBC) because of E-cadherin ablation, the inactivation of Myh9 led to the development of tumors recapitulating the features of human ILBC. Some observations suggest that defective MYH9 expression is associated with oncogenesis and/or tumor progression in human SCC and ILBC, thus also supporting a role for MYH9 as a tumor suppressor in humans.

=== Chronic kidney disease ===
Genetic variations in MYH9 may be involved in predisposition to chronic kidney disease (CKD). A haplotype of MYH9 (haplotype E1) was previously associated with the increased prevalence of glomerulosclerosis and non-diabetic end stage renal disease in African Americans and in Hispanic Americans. However, subsequent studies showed that this association is explained by strong linkage disequilibrium with two haplotypes (haplotypes G1 and G2) in the neighboring APOL1 gene. Nevertheless, some studies suggest an association of single-nucleotide polymorphisms in MYH9 with CKD that appears to be independent of the linkage with APOL1 G1 and G2.

=== Hearing loss ===
Inherited MYH9 mutations may be responsible for non-syndromic hearing loss.

== Interactions ==
MYH9 has been shown to interact with PRKCE.

== See also ==
- May Hegglin anomaly
