= Fechtner syndrome =

- Other names: Alport syndrome with leukocyte inclusions and macrothrombocytopenia
- Fechtner syndrome is inherited in an autosomal dominant manner.

Fechtner syndrome is a variant of Alport syndrome characterized by leukocyte inclusions, macrothrombocytopenia, thrombocytopenia, nephritis, and sensorineural hearing loss. Some patients may also develop cataracts.
