= May–Hegglin anomaly =

- Other names: Döhle leukocyte inclusions with giant platelets and Macrothrombocytopenia with leukocyte inclusions
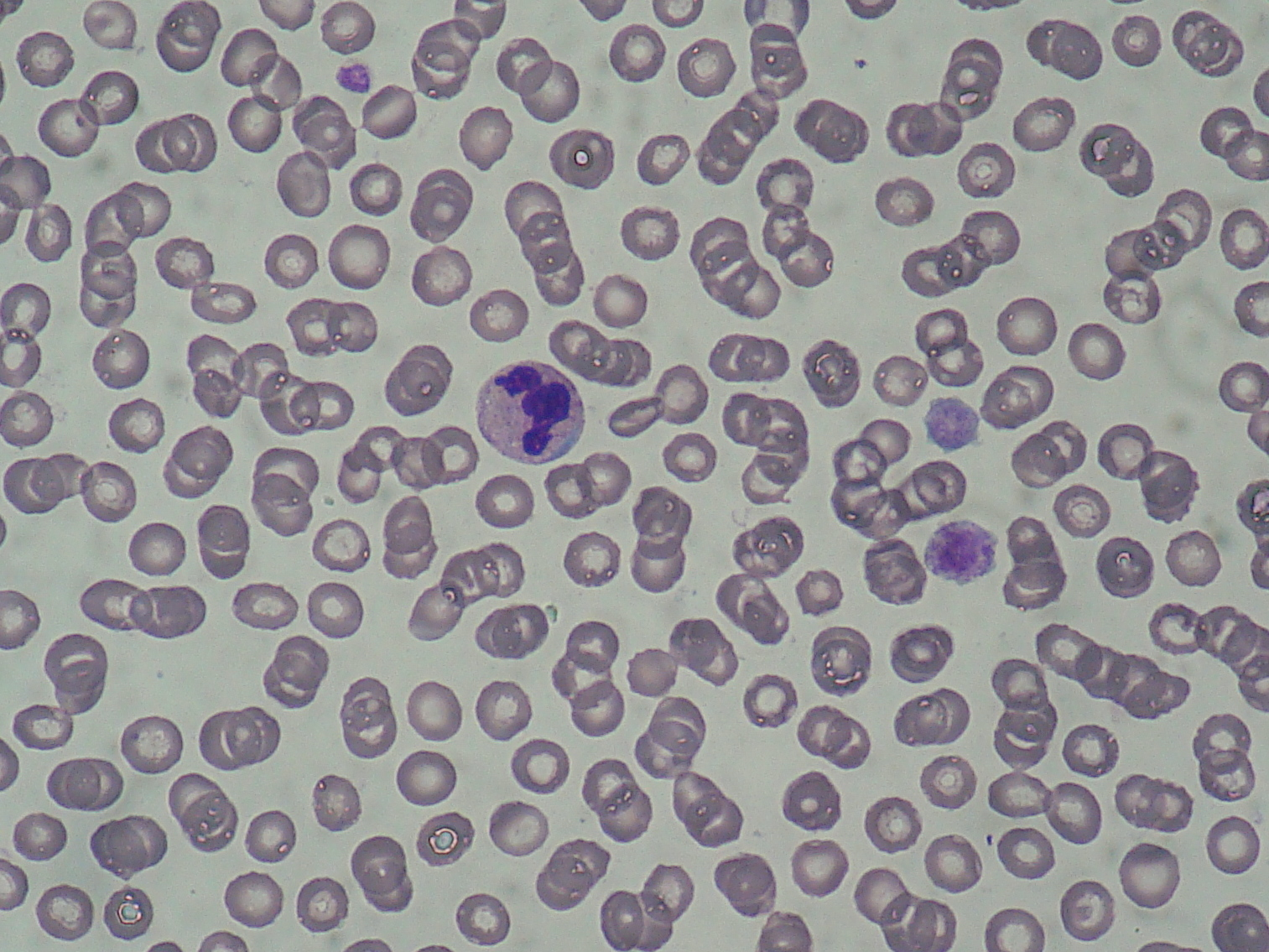
- Specialty: Hematology

May–Hegglin anomaly (MHA), is a rare genetic disorder of the blood platelets that causes them to be abnormally large.

== Presentation ==
In the leukocytes, the presence of very small rods (around 3 micrometers), or Döhle-like bodies can be seen in the cytoplasm.

== Pathogenesis ==
MHA is believed to be associated with the MYH9 gene. The pathogenesis of the disorder had been unknown until recently, when autosomal dominant mutations in the gene encoding non-muscle myosin heavy chain IIA (MYH9) were identified. Unique cytoplasmic inclusion bodies are aggregates of nonmuscle myosin heavy chain IIA, and are only present in granulocytes. These May-Hegglin inclusions are large, basophilic, cytoplasmic inclusions resembling Döhle bodies in the granulocytes. It is not yet known why inclusion bodies are not present in platelets, monocytes, and lymphocytes, or how giant platelets are formed. MYH9 is also found to be responsible for several related disorders with macrothrombocytopenia and leukocyte inclusions, including Sebastian, Fechtner, and Epstein syndromes, which feature deafness, nephritis, and/or cataract. MHA is also a feature of the Alport syndrome (hereditary nephritis with sensorineural hearing loss).

== Treatment ==
May-Hegglin Anomaly can be treated by various methods:

- Medication;Tranexamic Acid
- Desmopressin Acetate
- Platelet Transfusion will not work, because the affected platelets will overtake the new platelets.

== History ==
MHA is named for German physician Richard May (January 7, 1863 – 1936) and Swiss physician Robert Hegglin. The disorder was first described by Richard May in 1909 and was subsequently described by Robert Hegglin in 1945.
