= Neonatal alloimmune thrombocytopenia =

Disease that affects babies

Fetal and Neonatal Alloimmune Thrombocytopenia
- Other names: fetal and neonatal alloimmune thrombocytopenia (FNAIT), feto-maternal alloimmune thrombocytopenia (FMAITP, FMAIT)
- Specialty: Pediatrics

Neonatal alloimmune thrombocytopenia (NAITP, NAIT, NATP or NAT) is a disease that affects babies in which the platelet count is decreased because the mother's immune system attacks her fetus' or newborn's platelets. A low platelet count increases the risk of bleeding in the fetus and newborn. If the bleeding occurs in the brain, there may be long-term effects.

Platelet antigens are inherited from both mother and father. NAIT is caused by antibodies specific for platelet antigens inherited from the father but which are absent in the mother. Fetomaternal transfusions (or fetomaternal hemorrhage) results in the recognition of these antigens by the mother's immune system as non-self, with the subsequent generation of allo-reactive antibodies which cross the placenta. NAIT, hence, is caused by transplacental passage of maternal platelet-specific alloantibody and rarely human leukocyte antigen (HLA) allo-antibodies (which are expressed by platelets) to fetuses whose platelets express the corresponding antigens.

NAIT occurs in somewhere between 1/800 and 1/5000 live births. More recent studies of NAIT seem to indicate that it occurs in around 1/600 live births in the Caucasian population.

== Signs and symptoms ==
The diagnosis of NAIT is usually made after an incidental finding of a low platelet count on a blood test or because of bleeding complications ranging from bruising or petechiae to intracranial hemorrhage in the fetus or newborn.

Frequently, the reduction in platelet count is mild and the affected neonates remain largely asymptomatic. NAIT is the commonest cause of a very low platelet count, and the commonest cause of intracranial haemorrhage in the term neonate.

In case of severe thrombocytopenia, the neonates may exhibit bleeding complications at or a few hours after delivery. The most serious complication is intracranial hemorrhage, leading to death in approximately 10% of symptomatic babies or neurologic sequelae in 20% of cases. 80% of intracranial hemorrhages occur before birth. After birth the greatest risk of bleeding is in the first four days of life.

=== Related conditions ===
Immune thrombocytopenic purpura (ITP), sometimes called idiopathic thrombocytopenic purpura is a condition in which autoantibodies are directed against a patient's own platelets, causing platelet destruction and thrombocytopenia. Anti-platelet autoantibodies in a pregnant woman with immune thrombocytopenic purpura will attack the patient's own platelets and will also cross the placenta and react against fetal platelets. Therefore, ITP is a significant cause of fetal and neonatal immune thrombocytopenia. Approximately 10% of newborns affected by ITP will have platelet counts <50,000 μL^{−1} and 1% to 2% will have a risk of intracerebral hemorrhage comparable to infants with NAIT.

Mothers with thrombocytopenia or a previous diagnosis of ITP should be tested for serum anti-platelet antibodies. A woman with symptomatic thrombocytopenia and an identifiable anti-platelet antibody should be started on therapy for their ITP which may include steroids or IVIG. Fetal blood analysis to determine the platelet count is not generally performed as ITP-induced thrombocytopenia in the fetus is generally less severe than NAIT. Platelet transfusions may be performed in newborns, depending on the degree of thrombocytopenia.

=== Other conditions causing a low platelet count ===
Other conditions that can cause a low platelet count in the neonate include bacterial and viral infection, disseminated intravascular coagulation and other rare congenital conditions associated with a low platelet count.

== Pathophysiology ==
Platelets have many proteins on their surface. Each person has a different set of proteins, which are inherited from their parents. These different platelet proteins make different platelet groups, just like different proteins on red blood cells make different blood groups. These differences do not affect how the platelets work. However, if a baby inherits a protein that is found on the father's platelets but is absent from the mother's platelets, the mother may respond to this foreign protein by developing an antibody that fights against it.

This antibody may pass from the mother's blood into the baby's blood and attach to the baby's platelets. This antibody destroys the baby's platelets and suppresses production of fetal platelets, they are also thought to weaken the blood vessel walls (vascular integrity) and affect production of new blood vessels (angiogenesis). This results in an increased risk of bleeding for the baby, and this can lead to the baby's death. The mother's antibodies can remain in the baby's bloodstream for weeks, and bleeding can occur in the baby before birth (fetal), during birth or after birth (neonatal).

A number of different proteins can cause NAIT, about 80% of cases are caused by antibodies against platelet antigen HPA-1a, 15% by anti-HPA-5b, and 5% by other antibodies (e.g. HPA-1b, HPA-15, HPA-3 and HPA-9b). HPA-1a is present in 98% of the population of the United States, suggesting that approximately 2% of women who are HPA-1a negative may be at risk for NAIT during pregnancy. Of course, the antigen expression of the father must also be taken into account - in most cases the father is HPA-1a/1a or 1a/1b and the mother is HPA-1b/1b with anti-HPA-1a antibodies. In women of Asian descent, HPA-4 antigens are the most frequently implicated.

Studies have shown a relationship between maternal HLA type DRw52a (DRB3* 0101) and the development of anti-HPA-1a.

The offending antibodies are IgG subtype and therefore capable of crossing the placenta and entering the fetal circulation.

Unlike hemolytic disease of the fetus and newborn, NAIT occurs during the first pregnancy in up to 50% of cases, and the affected fetuses may develop severe thrombocytopenia (<50,000 μL^{−1}) very early during pregnancy (as early as 20 weeks gestation, consistent with the development of platelet antigens, and the majority of the time in utero). Usually, the thrombocytopenia increases as gestation progresses. During the first pregnancy, NAIT is often not detected until birth when the newborn presents with classic symptoms of thrombocytopenia including petechiae, bruising or intracranial hemorrhage. In utero intracranial hemorrhage occurs in about 10% to 30% of affected cases (and NAIT is thought to be the underlying cause in the majority of cases of intracranial hemorrhage due to thrombocytopenia- greater than all other causes of thrombocytopenia combined). The risk of hemorrhage is inversely related to the platelet count with the greatest risk when the platelet count is below 100,000 μL^{−1}.

The recurrence of NAIT has been estimated to be more than 80% in subsequent pregnancies in which the fetus also carries the target platelet antigen. Subsequent cases of NAIT may be equivalent or more severe.

The fetal response to NAIT is variable and may include compensatory extramedullary hematopoiesis. Rarely, fetal hydrops may develop. Fetal anemia (in presence of red cell incompatibility) may also occur.

== Diagnosis ==
Doctors may consider a diagnosis of NAIT if they notice bleeding or bruising in a baby, or low platelet counts on a blood test after birth, or neurologic symptoms. Some babies may have a specific pinpoint rash called "petechiae". If a diagnosis of NAIT is suspected, then the baby should be treated as if it had NAIT until the diagnosis is confirmed.

The diagnosis is confirmed by taking blood samples from the baby's parents, and sometimes the baby. Maternal and paternal platelet antigen phenotyping and screening of the maternal serum for anti-platelet antibodies can be performed. Additionally, platelet antigen genotyping can be performed on the maternal and paternal blood to determine the exact nature of the incompatibility.

Neonatal platelet counts on laboratory testing are typically under 20,000 μL^{−1}. Higher counts may suggest a different diagnosis, such as maternal immune thrombocytopenic purpura.

Even in mildly affected babies, it is important to fully investigate and diagnose the baby because the results can be critical for the effective management of any future pregnancies.

== Treatment ==
=== During pregnancy ===
Antenatal management only occurs if a mother has had a previously affected baby or a family member has had an affected baby.

Interventions can be classified as invasive or non-invasive.

A review of the evidence has shown that invasive management resulted in a relatively high complication rate (mainly preterm emergency cesarean section) of 11% per treated pregnancy. Noninvasive management was also shown to be effective, but without the relatively high rate of adverse outcomes seen with invasive management. They concluded that first-line antenatal management in NAIT should be non-invasive with weekly intravenous immunoglobulin administration, with or without the addition of corticosteroids.

Recent international guidelines have now recommended non-invasive management of NAIT. Previously there had been no international consensus on the optimal antenatal management of NAIT, and numerous strategies had been used in different centers that specialized in antenatal treatment.

==== Invasive management ====
Fetal blood sampling from the umbilical cord and intrauterine platelet transfusion was the first antenatal treatment for NAIT to prevent intracerebral hemorrhage. However, this is no longer recommended routinely because of the serious risk of harms. Cordocentesis in the presence of a low platelet count may lead to serious complications, these included slowing of the baby's heart (fetal bradycardia), tamponade of the cord, and bleeding complications in the baby, including exsanguination. Fetal blood sampling is estimated to cause death of the baby in 1.3% of procedures, however the incidence varies significantly from center to center. With an overall risk of death of the fetus due to the repeated procedures of about 3% (17 deaths out of 485 pregnancies).

In addition, given the short life span of transfused platelets, transfusions are needed regularly, increasing the overall risk of death of the baby. If intrauterine platelet transfusions are performed, they are generally repeated weekly (platelet lifespan after transfusion is approximately 8 to 10 days). Platelets administered to the fetus must be negative for the culprit antigen (often HPA-1a, as stated above). Many blood suppliers (such as American Red Cross; NHS Blood and Transplant; United Blood Services) have identified HPA-1a and 5b negative donors. An alternative donor is a mother who is, of course, negative for the culprit antigen. However, she must meet general criteria for donation and platelets received from the mother must be washed to remove the offending alloantibody and irradiated to reduce the risk of graft-versus-host disease. If platelet transfusions are needed urgently, incompatible platelets may be used, with the understanding that they may be less effective and that the administration of any blood product carries risk.

Any administered cellular blood products must be irradiated to reduce the risk of graft-versus-host disease in the fetus. Additionally, all administered blood products should be CMV reduced-risk (CMV seronegative and leukoreduced are considered essentially equivalent for the purposes of CMV risk reduction).

==== Non-invasive management ====
The use of Intravenous immunoglobulin (IVIG) during pregnancy and immediately after birth has been shown to help reduce or alleviate the effects of NAIT in infants and reduce the severity of thrombocytopenia. The most common treatment is weekly IVIG infusions at a dosage of 1 g/kg beginning at 12 to 16 weeks of pregnancy in women who have had a previously affected child with an intracranial hemorrhage. For all other pregnancies, use of IVIG should be discussed, and, if indicated, should be started before 24 weeks of pregnancy and continued until the birth of the child. In some cases this dosage is increased to 2 g/kg and/or combined with a course of prednisolone depending on the exact circumstances of the case.

In a review they found that giving IVIG alone during pregnancy prevented intracranial hemorrhage in 98.7% of treated pregnancies (4 cases occurred in 315 pregnancies). This is a similar estimate to a previous review that only assessed the evidence within randomised controlled trials. They also found no consistent benefit of adding steroids to IVIG.

The goal of both IVIG and platelet transfusion is to avoid hemorrhage. Ultrasound monitoring to detect hemorrhage in the fetus is not recommended as detection of intracranial hemorrhage generally indicates permanent brain damage (there is no intervention that can be performed to reverse the damage once it has occurred).

Before delivery, the fetal platelet count may not be known, due to the high risks associated with cordocentesis (see above). If the platelet count is not known then assisted forms of delivery, for example forceps or ventouse, should be avoided to reduce the risk of harm. If the delivery has been planned then antigen negative platelets should be available in case the infant's platelet count is low on a cord blood sample.

=== After birth ===
The most rapidly effective treatment in infants with severe hemorrhage and/or a very low platelet count (<30,000 μL^{−1}) is the transfusion of compatible platelets (i.e. platelets from a donor who, like the mother, lacks the causative antigen). If antigen negative platelets are unavailable, then standard neonatal platelet transfusions should be given until antigen negative platelets become available. If a platelet transfusion is not available immediately then the infant can be given IVIG (1g/kg) however, this will have no effect on the platelet count before 24 to 72 hours.

A platelet transfusion is required immediately if there is severe or life-threatening bleeding. If life-threatening bleeding occurs, for example an intracranial hemorrhage, then the platelet count needs to be increased to decrease the risk of further bleeding (> 100,000 μL^{−1}).

Any infant with suspected NAIT should have an ultrasound of the head within the first 24 hours after birth to make sure that there is no evidence of an intracranial hemorrhage.

If the infant has a platelet count >30,000 μL^{−1} and no evidence of bleeding, then the baby can be monitored with blood counts until the blood counts return to normal, without the need for any additional treatment. In the past, infusions of IVIG (1 g/kg/day for two days) have been given to the infant and have been shown to rapidly increase the platelet count. However, IVIG and platelet transfusions are also associated with harm and therefore should be avoided if they are not necessary.

After a first affected pregnancy, if a mother has plans for a subsequent pregnancy, then the mother and father should be typed for platelet antigens and the mother screened for alloantibodies. Testing is available through reference laboratories (such as ARUP). DNA testing of the father can be used to determine zygosity of the involved antigen and therefore risk to future pregnancies (if homozygous for the antigen, all subsequent pregnancies will be affected, if heterozygous, there is an approximate 50% risk to each subsequent pregnancy). During subsequent pregnancies, the genotype of the fetus can also be determined using amniotic fluid analysis or maternal blood as early as 18 weeks gestation to definitively determine the risk to the fetus.
