= Alpha granule =

Cellular component of platelets

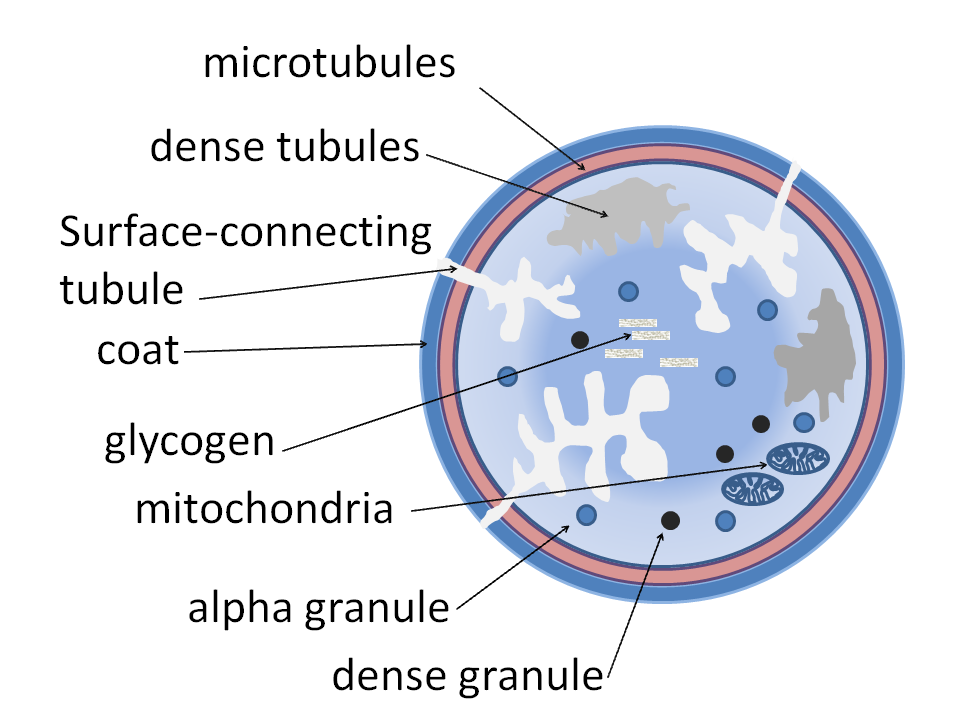
- Alpha granules shown in a platelet

Details
- Part of: Platelets

Identifiers
- Latin: granulum alpha
- TH: H2.00.04.1.03005

Alpha granules, (α-granules) also known as platelet alpha-granules are a cellular component of platelets. Platelets contain different types of granules that perform different functions, and include alpha granules, dense granules, and lysosomes. Of these, alpha granules are the most common, making up 50% to 80% of the secretory granules. Alpha granules contain several growth factors.

== Contents ==
Contents include insulin-like growth factor 1, platelet-derived growth factors, TGF beta, platelet factor 4 (which is a heparin-binding chemokine) and other clotting proteins (such as thrombospondin, fibronectin, factor V, and von Willebrand factor).

The alpha granules express the adhesion molecule P-selectin and CD63. These are transferred to the membrane after synthesis.

The other type of granules within platelets are called dense granules.

== Clinical significance ==
A deficiency of alpha granules is known as gray platelet syndrome.

== See also ==
- Platelet rich fibrin
