= Alloimmunity =

Immune response to nonself antigens from members of the same species

In immunology, alloimmunity or isoimmunity is an immune response to nonself antigens from members of the same species, which are called alloantigens or isoantigens. Two major types of alloantigens are blood group antigens and histocompatibility antigens. In alloimmunity, the body creates antibodies (called alloantibodies) against the alloantigens, attacking transfused blood, allotransplanted tissue, and even the fetus in some cases. Alloimmune (isoimmune) response results in graft rejection, which is manifested as deterioration or complete loss of graft function. In contrast, autoimmunity is an immune response to the self's own antigens. (The allo- prefix means "other", whereas the auto- prefix means "self".) Alloimmunization (isoimmunization) is the process of becoming alloimmune, that is, developing the relevant antibodies for the first time.

Alloimmunity is caused by the difference between products of highly polymorphic genes, primarily genes of the major histocompatibility complex, of the donor and graft recipient. These products are recognized by T-lymphocytes and other mononuclear leukocytes which infiltrate the graft and damage it.

== Types of the rejection ==
=== Transfusion reaction ===
Blood transfusion can result in alloantibodies reacting towards the transfused cells, resulting in a transfusion reaction. Even with standard blood compatibility testing, there is a risk of reaction against human blood group systems other than ABO and Rh.

=== Hemolytic disease of the fetus and newborn ===
Hemolytic disease of the fetus and newborn is similar to a transfusion reaction in that the mother's antibodies cannot tolerate the fetus's antigens, which happens when the immune tolerance of pregnancy is impaired. In many instances the maternal immune system attacks the fetal blood cells, resulting in fetal anemia. HDN ranges from mild to severe. Severe cases require intrauterine transfusions or early delivery to survive, while mild cases may only require phototherapy at birth.

=== Transplant rejection ===
==== Acute rejection ====
Acute rejection is subsequent to the recipient's immune system identifies a graft organ as foreign. This results in the mounting of an immune response, leading to organ rejection and destruction. Acute rejection is caused by antigen-specific Th1 and cytotoxic T-lymphocytes. They recognize transplanted tissue because of expression of alloantigens. When a genetic difference between the donor and recipient is detected, the immune system of the recipient identifies MHC I and MHC II as foreign. Subsequently, CD4+ T-cells react to these alloantigens presented by antigen-presenting cells (APCs), resulting in the release of cytokines which stimulate immune reactivity. A transplant is rejected during first several days or weeks after transplantation.

==== Hyperacute and accelerated rejection ====
Hyperacute and accelerated rejection is antibody-mediated immune response to the allograft. The difference between hyperacute and acute rejection lies in the presence of preformed antibodies that cause an instantaneous rejection. Recipient's blood already contains circulating antibodies before the transplantation – either IgM or antibodies incurred by previous immunization (e.g. by repeated blood transfusion). In case of hyperacute rejection, antibodies activate complement; moreover, the reaction can be enhanced by neutrophils. This type of rejection is very fast, the graft is rejected in a few minutes or hours after the transplantation. Accelerated rejection leads to phagocyte and NK cell activation (not of the complement) through their Fc receptors that bind Fc parts of antibodies. Graft rejection occurs within 3 to 5 days. This type of rejection is a typical response to xenotransplants.

==== Chronic rejection ====
Chronic rejection is not yet fully understood, but it is known that it is associated with alloantibody and cytokine production. Endothelium of the blood vessels is being damaged, therefore the graft is not sufficiently supplied with blood and is replaced with fibrous tissue (fibrosis). It takes two months at least to reject the graft in this way.

== Mechanisms of rejection ==
Unlimited graft acceptance is hindered by allogenic immune responses. CD4^{+} and CD8^{+} T-lymphocytes along with other mononuclear leukocytes (their exact function regarding the topic is not known) participate in the rejection. B-lymphocytes, NK cells and cytokines also play a role in it.

- Cellular rejection – CD4^{+} and CD8^{+} T-lymphocytes, NK cells
- Humoral rejection – B-lymphocytes
- Cytokines

=== B-lymphocytes ===
Humoral (antibody-mediated) type of rejection is caused by recipient's B-lymphocytes which produce alloantibodies against donor MHC class I and II molecules. These alloantibodies can activate the complement – this leads to target cell lysis. Alternatively, donor cells are coated with alloantibodies that initiate phagocytosis through Fc receptors of mononuclear leukocytes. The mechanism of humoral rejection is relevant for hyperacute, accelerated and chronic rejection. Alloimmunity can be also regulated by neonatal B cells.

In addition to humoral immune responses, B-lymphocytes aid in T-cell activation by acting as antigen-presenting cells (APCs). This is activation by indirect allorecognition is crucial, as these T-cells are able to translocate the follicular border to retrieve a T-follicular helper cell (Tfh). This will then lead to an induced B-cellular response. They are important for lymphoid neogenesis (de novo formation of lymphoid tissues during transplant rejection) and forming in-graft tertiary lymphoid organs (TLOs). TLOs also encourage a local alloimmune response needed for recovery and long-term health outcomes.

=== Cytokines ===
Cytokine microenvironment where CD4^{+} T-lymphocytes recognize alloantigens significantly influences polarization of the immune response.

- CD4^{+} T-lymphocytes differentiate into Th1 helper cells in the presence of IL-12 (which is usually secreted by mature dendritic cells). Th1 cells produce proinflammatory cytokine IFN-γ and destroy the allograft tissue.
- If there is IL-4, CD4^{+} T-lymphocytes become Th2 cells secreting IL-4 and IL-5. Then allograft tolerance is mostly observed.
- TGF-β induces expression of Foxp3 gene in the absence of proinflammatory cytokines and thus differentiation of CD4^{+} T-lymphocytes into regulatory T cells (Treg). Regulatory T cells produce anti-inflammatory cytokines IL-10 and TGF-β which ensures the allograft tolerance.
- However, in the presence of IL-6 or IL-21 along with TGF-β, CD4^{+} T-lymphocytes acquire tissue-destructive Th17 phenotype and secrete IL-17.

=== NK cells ===
NK cells can also directly target the transplanted tissue. It depends on the balance of activating and inhibitory NK cell receptors and on their ligands expressed by the graft. Receptors of KIR (Killer-cell immunoglobulin-like receptor) family bind concrete MHC class I molecules. If the graft has these ligands on its surface, NK cell cannot be activated (KIR receptors provide inhibitory signal). So if these ligands are missing, there is no inhibitory signal and NK cell becomes activated. It recognizes target cells by "missing-self strategy" and induces their apoptosis by enzymes perforin and granzymes released from its cytotoxic granules. Alloreactive NK cells also secrete proinflammatory cytokines IFN-γ and TNF-α to increase expression of MHC molecules and costimulatory receptors on the surface of APCs (antigen-presenting cells). This promotes APC maturation which leads to amplification of T-cell alloreactivity by means of direct and also indirect pathway of alloantigen recognition (as described below). NK cells are able to kill Foxp3^{+} regulatory T-lymphocytes as well and shift the immune response from graft tolerance toward its rejection. Besides the ability of NK cells to influence APC maturation and T cell development, they can probably reduce or even prevent alloimmune response to transplanted tissue – either by killing the Donor APCs or by anti-inflammatory cytokine IL-10 and TGF-β secretion. NK cell sub-populations differ in alloreactivity rate and in their immunomodulatory potential. Concerning immunosuppressive drugs, the effects on NK cells are milder in comparison to T cells.

=== T-lymphocytes ===
Alloantigen recognition

Alloantigen on APC surface can be recognized by recipient's T-lymphocytes through two different pathways:

- Direct allorecognition – occurs when donor's APCs are presenting graft antigens. Recipient's T-lymphocytes can identify either MHC molecules alone or complex MHC molecule-foreign peptide as alloantigens. Specific T-cell receptors (TCR) of CD8^{+} T-lymphocytes recognize these peptides when form the complex with MHC class I molecules and TCR of CD4^{+} T-lymphocytes recognize a complex with MHC class II molecules.
- Indirect allorecognition – recipient's APCs infiltrate transplanted tissue, then they process and present, as any other foreign peptides, donor's MHC glycoproteins by MHC class II molecules. Mechanism of indirect allorecognition and therefore the involvement of CD4^{+} T-lymphocytes is the main cause of graft rejection. That is why the compatibility between donor and recipient MHC class II molecules is the most important factor concerning transplantation.

Activation of T-lymphocytes

T-lymphocytes are fully activated under two conditions:

- T-lymphocytes must recognize complex MHC-alloantigen presented by APC through direct or indirect allorecognition pathway.
- T-lymphocytes must receive costimulatory signal. There are costimulatory molecules on T-cell surface and APCs express their ligands (e.g. molecule CD28, which is on the surface of all naïve CD4^{+} and CD8^{+} T-lymphocytes, can bind ligands CD80 and CD86). Receptor-ligand engagement triggers T-cell signaling resulting in IL-2 production, clonal expansion and therefore development of effector and memory T-lymphocytes. In contrast, there are also such receptors on T-lymphocytes that cause inhibition of T-cell activation (for instance CD152/CTLA-4 receptor which binds CD80 and CD86 as well). If T-lymphocyte does not receive costimulatory signal, its activation fails and it becomes anergic.

Alloimmune response can be enhanced by proinflammatory cytokines and by CD4^{+} T-lymphocytes that are responsible for APC maturation and IL-2 production. IL-2 is crucial for memory CD8^{+} T cell development. These cells may represent a serious problem after the transplantation. As the effect of being exposed to various infections in the past, antigen-specific T-lymphocytes have developed in patient's body. Part of them is kept in organism as memory cells and these cells could be a reason for "cross-reactivity" – immune response against unrelated but similar graft alloantigens. This immune response is called secondary and is faster, more efficient and more robust.

== Graft tolerance ==
Transplanted tissue is accepted by immunocompetent recipient if it is functional in the absence of immunosuppressive drugs and without histologic signs of rejection. Host can accept another graft from the same donor but reject graft from different donor. Graft acceptance depends on the balance of proinflammatory Th1, Th17 lymphocytes and anti-inflammatory regulatory T cells. This is influenced by cytokine microenvironment, as mentioned before, where CD4^{+} T-lymphocytes are activated and also by inflammation level (because pathogens invading organism activate the immune system to various degrees and causing proinflammatory cytokine secretion, therefore they support the rejection). Immunosuppressive drugs are used to suppress the immune response, but the effect is not specific. Therefore, organism can be affected by the infection much more easily. The goal of the future therapies is to suppress the alloimmune response specifically to prevent these risks. The tolerance could be achieved by elimination of most or all alloreactive T cells and by influencing alloreactive effector-regulatory T-lymphocytes ratio in favor of regulatory cells which could inhibit alloreactive effector cells. Another method would be based on costimulatory signal blockade during alloreactive T-lymphocytes activation.

== Disparities in Maternal Alloimmunity/Alloimmunization Care ==
Although alloimmunization is not a common phenomenon, roughly 2% among prenatal women, lack of proper care has been shown to result in complications during pregnancy, mortality, and significant morbidity. Most often, pregnant women are susceptible to Red Blood Cell (RBC) alloimmunization. RBC alloimmunization is a result of exposure to non-self antigens, ranging from events like fetomaternal hemorrhage during pregnancy or blood and organ transfusions, among a plethora of different circumstances.

Historically, inaccessibility of proper care prior pregnancy and gaps in prevention strategies have affected certain groups of pregnant women more than others. There is evidence that, in the United States, insufficient care among racial and ethnic minorities are at higher risk of having severe alloimmunization that requires intrauterine transfusions (IUTs). For example, roughly 18.6% of the IUT cohort were non-English speakers compared to 4.6% of maternal alloimmunization cases. This demonstrates the need for research in alloimmunity, especially amongst prenatal women, as well as accounting for adequate prenatal care for women of racial/ethnic minorities in the United States. For example, ensuring pregnant women receive Rho(D) immune globulin (RhIG) during pregnancy is crucial to reduce the risk of maternal alloimmunization.

Another risk factor that has been identified is the presence of anti-D antibodies in pregnant women. Over half the women who suffer from maternal alloimmunization have anti-D antibodies which require anti-D prophylaxis and RhIG for treatment. Furthermore, the risk of alloimmunization was higher in women within the Rhesus D-negative blood group, histories of blood transfusion, and poor obstetric history. Other risk factors have been identified, such as an instance of fetomaternal hemorrhage (FMH; a relatively common occurrence in pregnancy), RBC and maternal genetics, as well as previous transfusions. Additionally, mothers who are expecting and have sickle-cell disorder or thalassemia are often more likely to come across complications with alloimmunity due to frequent transfusions. Transfusions expose these individuals, often of racial and ethnic minorities where these conditions are more prevalent, to many antigens from donors that results in alloimmunization. Identifying these risks early in pregnancies and screening more thoroughly prevents instances of hemolytic disease of the fetus and newborn (HDFN) as well as protect the mother's longterm health.

== See also ==
- Allograft diseases
- Allotransplantation
- Neonatal alloimmune thrombocytopenia
- Hemolytic disease of the newborn

== General and cited references ==
- Cellular and Molecular Immunology, 7th edition by Abul K. Abbas, Andrew H. Lichtman, Shiv Pillai. Saunders Copyright.
