= Vafidemstat =

Experimental enzyme inhibitor

Clinical data
- Other names: ORY-2001; ORY2001
- Routes of administration: Oral
- Drug class: Lysine-specific demethylase 1 (LSD1) inhibitor; Monoamine oxidase B (MAO-B) inhibitor

Identifiers
- IUPAC name: 5-[[[(1R,2S)-2-(4-phenylmethoxyphenyl)cyclopropyl]amino]methyl]-1,3,4-oxadiazol-2-amine
- CAS Number: 1357362-02-7
- PubChem CID: 66714983
- DrugBank: DB16446
- ChemSpider: 68019508
- UNII: LZ82JLT4UP
- ChEMBL: ChEMBL4802155

Chemical and physical data
- Formula: C_{19}H_{20}N_{4}O_{2}
- Molar mass: 336.395 g·mol^{−1}
- 3D model (JSmol): Interactive image
- SMILES: C1[C@H]([C@@H]1NCC2=NN=C(O2)N)C3=CC=C(C=C3)OCC4=CC=CC=C4
- InChI: InChI=1S/C19H20N4O2/c20-19-23-22-18(25-19)11-21-17-10-16(17)14-6-8-15(9-7-14)24-12-13-4-2-1-3-5-13/h1-9,16-17,21H,10-12H2,(H2,20,23)/t16-,17+/m0/s1; Key:XBBRLCXCBCZIOI-DLBZAZTESA-N

Vafidemstat (INN; developmental code name ORY-2001) is a dual inhibitor of the enzymes lysine-specific demethylase 1 (LSD1; KDM1A) and monoamine oxidase B (MAO-B) which is under development for the treatment of a variety of medical conditions, including aggression, Alzheimer's disease, borderline personality disorder, multiple sclerosis, acute respiratory disease in COVID-19 infection, and schizophrenia. It is or was also being developed for several other indications, but no recent development has been reported for these uses. The drug is taken by mouth.

As of October 2024, vafidemstat is in phase 2 clinical trials for aggression, Alzheimer's disease, borderline personality disorder, multiple sclerosis, COVID-19 acute respiratory disease, and schizophrenia. Conversely, no recent development has been reported for autism, dementia, Huntington's disease, Parkinson's disease, and telomeric 22q13 monosomy syndrome. It is being developed by Oryzon.

Other LSD1 inhibitors that are under development for medical use include bomedemstat (IMG-7289), iadademstat (ORY-1001), phenelzine (Nardil), pulrodemstat (CC-90011), seclidemstat (SP-2577), and tranylcypromine (Parnate). Another drug, zavondemstat (QC8222, TACH101), is a pan-inhibitor of lysine-specific demethylase 4 (LSD4; KDM4), and is being researched for the treatment of cancer. Vafidemstat contains the chemical structure of (1S,2R)-tranylcypromine within its own structure.

== See also ==
- List of investigational aggression drugs
- List of investigational antipsychotics
- List of investigational borderline personality disorder drugs
