= Hydroxyurea dermopathy =

- Skeletal formula of the hydroxyurea molecule.
- Specialty: Dermatology

Hydroxyurea dermopathy is caused by chronic use of hydroxyurea for chronic myelogenous leukemia, thrombocytosis, or psoriasis, and presents with skin lesions characteristic of dermatomyositis.

== See also ==
- Skin lesion
- List of cutaneous conditions
