= Phenylcyclopropylamine =

Tranylcypromine, the simplest phenylcyclopropylamine.

Phenylcyclopropylamines, or 2-phenylcyclopropylamines, also known as phenylcypromines, are phenethylamine and amphetamine derivatives in which the alkyl side chain has been cyclized into a cyclopropyl ring. Examples include the monoamine oxidase inhibitor (MAOI) antidepressant tranylcypromine (trans-2-phenylcyclopropylamine) and the synthetic psychedelics DMCPA (2,5-dimethoxy-4-methylphenylcyclopropylamine) and 3,4,5-trimethoxytranylcypromine (TMT; MCPA), among various others. Other phenylcyclopropylamines include bomedemstat, iadademstat, and vafidemstat.

Chemical structures of selected phenylcyclopropylamines
Tranylcypromine

DMCPA (25D-CPA)

TMT (MCPA)

Bomedemstat

Vafidemstat

== See also ==
- Cyclized phenethylamine
- Lumocaserin
