= Hydrea =

Hydrea may refer to:

- Hydra island
- A brand name for the medication hydroxycarbamide
