= 3,4,5-Trimethoxytranylcypromine =

TMT

Clinical data
- Other names: TMT; MCPA; trans-2-(3,4,5-Trimethoxyphenyl)cyclopropylamine
- Drug class: Possible serotonergic psychedelic or hallucinogen
- ATC code: None

Identifiers
- IUPAC name: 2-(3,4,5-trimethoxyphenyl)cyclopropan-1-amine
- CAS Number: 17061-21-1
- PubChem CID: 28236
- ChemSpider: 26269
- UNII: 6U05WT3K0H
- CompTox Dashboard (EPA): DTXSID90937795

Chemical and physical data
- Formula: C_{12}H_{17}NO_{3}
- Molar mass: 223.272 g·mol^{−1}
- 3D model (JSmol): Interactive image
- SMILES: COc1cc(cc(c1OC)OC)C1CC1N
- InChI: InChI=1S/C12H17NO3/c1-14-10-4-7(8-6-9(8)13)5-11(15-2)12(10)16-3/h4-5,8-9H,6,13H2,1-3H3; Key:HNYWYOQSLRJIMG-UHFFFAOYSA-N

3,4,5-Trimethoxytranylcypromine (TMT), also known as MCPA as well as trans-2-(3,4,5-trimethoxyphenyl)cyclopropylamine, is a possible psychedelic drug of the phenethylamine, scaline, and phenylcyclopropylamine families related to mescaline (3,4,5-trimethoxyphenethylamine). It is a cyclized phenethylamine and the analogue of mescaline in which the α and β positions of the ethyl side chain have been cyclized to form a cyclopropane ring. The drug may also be thought of as a structural hybrid between mescaline and the antidepressant tranylcypromine.

== Use and effects ==
In his book PiHKAL (Phenethylamines I Have Known and Loved), Alexander Shulgin reported that TMT produced no central effects at a dose of 13 mg orally. Higher doses were not assessed.

== Pharmacology ==
TMT has been reported to produce mescaline-like effects in animals with similar or slightly greater potency than mescaline but a slightly shorter duration. TMT is the trans isomer of a pair of cis and trans isomers, and it is specifically the trans isomer that is active.

== History ==
TMT was first described in the scientific literature by G. C. Walters and P. D. Cooper in 1968. Alexander Shulgin subsequently described evaluating a low dose of TMT in humans in his 1991 book PiHKAL (Phenethylamines I Have Known and Loved). TMT was one of the earliest psychedelic-related cyclized phenethylamines to be evaluated. Subsequently, the much more potent 2,5-dimethoxy-4-methylphenylcyclopropylamine (DMCPA) was developed.

== Society and culture ==
=== Legal status ===
==== Canada ====
TMT is not a controlled substance in Canada as of 2025.

== See also ==
- Substituted methoxyphenethylamine
- Cyclized phenethylamine
- Phenylcyclopropylamine
- Scaline
- 2,5-Dimethoxy-4-methylphenylcyclopropylamine (DMCPA)
