= C26H29N3O3 =

The molecular formula C_{26}H_{29}N_{3}O_{3} (molar mass: 431.536 g/mol) may refer to:

- SB-649915
- Tirbanibulin
- Zavondemstat
