= C19H20N4O2 =

The molecular formula C_{19}H_{20}N_{4}O_{2} (molar mass: 336.395 g/mol) may refer to:

- Plinabulin
- Vafidemstat
