= Management of borderline personality disorder =

The mainstay of management of borderline personality disorder is various forms of psychotherapy with medications being found to be of little use.

== Psychotherapy ==
There has traditionally been skepticism about the psychological treatment of personality disorders, but several specific types of psychotherapy for BPD have developed in recent years. There is growing evidence for the role of psychotherapy in the treatment of people with BPD, with indications that both comprehensive and non-comprehensive psychotherapeutic interventions may have a beneficial effect. Supportive therapy alone may enhance self-esteem and mobilize the existing strengths of individuals with BPD. Specific psychotherapies may involve sessions over several months or, as is particularly common for personality disorders, several years. Psychotherapy can often be conducted either with individuals or with groups. Group therapy can aid the learning and practice of interpersonal skills and self-awareness by individuals with BPD, though drop-out rates may be problematic.

=== Dialectical behavioral therapy ===
University of Washington psychology professor Marsha Linehan is credited with developing the first empirically supported standard treatment for BPD, termed dialectical behavioral therapy (DBT). DBT grew dramatically in popularity among mental health professionals following the publication of Linehan's treatment manuals for DBT in 1993. DBT was originally developed as an intervention for patients who meet criteria for BPD and particularly those who are highly suicidal.

DBT draws its principles from behavioral science (including cognitive-behavioral techniques), dialectical philosophy and Zen practice. The treatment emphasizes balancing acceptance and change (hence dialectic), with the overall goal of helping patients not just survive but build a life worth living. Treatment is delivered in four stages, with self-harm and other life-threatening issues taking priority. In the second stage, patients are encouraged to experience the painful emotions that they have been avoiding. Stage three addresses problems of living such as career and marital problems. Finally, stage four focuses on helping clients feel complete and reducing feelings of emptiness and boredom.

DBT encompasses four modes of therapy:

- The first mode is traditional individual therapy between a single therapist and client.
- The second mode of therapy is skills training; a core component of DBT is learning new behavioral skills, including mindfulness, interpersonal effectiveness (e.g. assertiveness and social skill), coping adaptively with distress and crises, and identifying and regulating emotional reactions.
- The third mode of therapy used is skills generalization, which focuses on helping clients integrate the skills taught in DBT into real-life situations. This usually involves coaching in the form of telephone contact outside of normal therapy hours. The calls are usually brief interactions focused on helping clients apply specific skills to circumstances they are experiencing.
- The fourth mode of therapy is the use of a consultation team designed to support the therapists. These teams have several important functions including reducing therapist burnout, providing therapy for the therapists, improving empathy for clients and providing ongoing consultations for client difficulties.

The goal of all DBT treatment approaches is to reduce the ineffective action tendencies linked to dysregulated emotions. DBT is based on a biosocial theory of personality functioning in which the core problem is seen as the breakdown of the patient's cognitive, behavioral and emotional regulation systems when experiencing intense emotions. The etiology of BPD is seen as a biological predisposition toward emotional dysregulation combined with a perceived invalidating social environment.

DBT can be based on a biosocial theory of personality functioning in which BPD is seen as a biological disorder of emotional regulation in a social environment experienced as invalidating by the borderline patient.

Several random controlled trials comparing DBT to other forms of cognitive-behavioral treatments have favored the use of DBT to treat borderline patients. Specifically, DBT has been found to significantly reduce self-injury, suicidal behavior, impulsivity, self-rated anger and the use of crisis services among borderline patients. These reductions have been found even when controlling for other treatment factors such as therapist experience, affordability of treatment, gender of therapist and the number of hours spent in individual therapy. In a meta-analysis it was found that DBT was moderately effective. However, none of the studied therapies (including CBT) "fulfilled the criteria for empirically supported treatment." The additional efficacy in the overall treatment of BPD is less clear; future research is needed to isolate the specific components of DBT that are most effective in treating BPD. Furthermore, little research has examined the efficacy of DBT in treating male and minority patients with BPD. Training nurses in the use of DBT has been found to replace a therapeutic pessimism with a more optimistic understanding and outlook.

=== Schema therapy ===
Schema therapy (also called schema-focused therapy) is an integrative approach based on cognitive-behavioral or skills-based techniques along with object relations and gestalt approaches. It directly targets deeper aspects of emotion, personality and schemas (fundamental ways of categorizing and reacting to the world). The treatment also focuses on the relationship with the therapist (including a process of "limited re-parenting"), daily life outside of therapy and traumatic childhood experiences. It was developed by Jeffrey Young and became established in the 1990s. Limited recent research suggests it is significantly more effective than transference-focused psychotherapy, with half of individuals with borderline personality disorder assessed as having achieved full recovery after four years, with two-thirds showing clinically significant improvement. Another very small trial has also suggested efficacy.

=== Cognitive behavioral therapy ===
Cognitive behavioral therapy (CBT) is the most widely used and established psychological treatment for mental disorders, but has appeared less successful in BPD, due partly to difficulties in developing a therapeutic relationship and treatment adherence. Approaches such as DBT and schema-focused therapy developed partly as an attempt to expand and add to traditional CBT, which uses a limited number of sessions to target specific maladaptive patterns of thought, perception and behavior. A recent study did find a number of sustained benefits of CBT, in addition to treatment as usual, after an average of 16 sessions over one year.

=== Psychoanalysis ===
It is in the DSM-IV that the term took two orientations: one psychiatric, and the other behavioral, included in a psychoanalytic psychopathology. According to this split, the diagnosis takes on, or a character of symptoms to be eradicated, or a particular type of patient of psychoanalysts.

=== Psychodynamic psychotherapy generally ===
Psychodynamic psychotherapy (PP) are different types of psychotherapy derived from psychoanalysis. The duration of psychodynamic psychotherapy ranges from 10 to 25 sessions (short term psychodynamic psychotherapy) to over 200 sessions. The main emphasis of these measures are very different. Similar treatment principles mainly focus on one or several target problems by using the foundation of modern psychoanalytic theory. Results of meta-analysis show that psychodynamic psychotherapy has large effects in the treatment of personality disorders. The results indicate that psychodynamic psychotherapy causes long term changes in personality disorders.

=== Transference-focused psychotherapy ===
Transference-focused psychotherapy (TFP) is a form of psychoanalytic therapy dating to the 1960s, rooted in the conceptions of Otto Kernberg on BPD and its underlying structure (borderline personality organization). Unlike in the case of traditional psychoanalysis, the therapist plays a very active role in TFP. In session the therapist works on the relationship between the patient and the therapist. The main focus is on the patient's emotions concerning their relationship with the therapist and the therapist's use of psychodynamic techniques (e.g., interpretation). The therapist will try to explore and clarify aspects of this relationship so the underlying object relations dyads become clear. Some limited research on TFP suggests it may reduce some symptoms of BPD by affecting certain underlying processes, and that TFP in comparison to dialectical behavioral therapy and supportive therapy results in increased reflective functioning (the ability to realistically think about how others think) and a more secure attachment style. Furthermore, TFP has been shown to be as effective as DBT in improvement of suicidal behavior, and has been more effective than DBT in alleviating anger and in reducing verbal or direct assaultive behavior. Limited research suggests that TFP appears to be less effective than schema-focused therapy, while being more effective than no treatment.

=== Cognitive analytic therapy ===
Cognitive analytic therapy combines cognitive and psychoanalytic approaches and has been adapted for use with individuals with BPD with mixed results.

=== Mentalization-based treatment ===
Mentalization-based treatment, developed by Peter Fonagy and Antony Bateman, rests on the assumption that people with BPD have a disturbance of attachment due to problems in the early childhood parent-child relationship. Fonagy and Bateman hypothesize that inadequate parental mirroring and attunement in early childhood lead to a deficit in mentalization, "the capacity to think about mental states as separate from, yet potentially causing actions"; in other words the capacity to intuitively understand the thoughts, intentions and motivations of others, and the connections between one's own thoughts, feelings and actions. Mentalization failure is thought to underlie BPD patients' problems with impulse control, mood instability and difficulties sustaining intimate relationships. Mentalization based treatment aims to develop patients' self-regulation capacity through a psychodynamically informed multi-modal treatment program that incorporates group psychotherapy and individual psychotherapy in a therapeutic community, partial hospitalization or outpatient context. In a randomized controlled trial, a group of BPD patients received 18 months of intensive partial-hospitalization MBT followed by 18 months of group psychotherapy, and were followed up over five years. The treatment group showed significant benefits across a range of measures including number of suicide attempts, reduced time in hospital and reduced use of medication.

=== Marital or family therapy ===
Marital therapy can be helpful in stabilizing the marital relationship and in reducing marital conflict and stress that can worsen BPD symptoms. Family therapy or family psychoeducation can help educate family members regarding BPD, improve family communication and problem solving, and provide support to family members in dealing with their loved one's illness.

Two patterns of family involvement can help clinicians plan family interventions: overinvolvement and neglect. Borderline patients who are from overinvolved families are often actively struggling with a dependency issue by denial or by anger at their parents.

Interest in the use of psychoeducation and skills training approaches for families with borderline members is growing.

== Medication ==
The UK's National Institute for Health and Clinical Excellence (NICE) in 2009 advises against the use of medication for treating borderline personality disorder, recommending that they only be considered for comorbid conditions. A Cochrane review from 2006 arrived at the same conclusion, but a 2010 update found that some pharmacological interventions (second generation antipsychotics, mood stabilisers and dietary supplementation with omega 3 fatty acids) might provide beneficial effects. However, the authors warned that total BPD severity is not significantly influenced by any drug and that the evidence generated by the review was based on single study effect estimates. No promising results were available for the core BPD symptoms of chronic feelings of emptiness, identity disturbance and abandonment.

=== Antidepressants ===
Selective serotonin reuptake inhibitor (SSRI) antidepressants have been shown in randomized controlled trials to improve the attendant symptoms of anxiety and depression, such as anger and hostility, associated with BPD in some patients. According to Listening to Prozac, it takes a higher dose of an SSRI to treat mood disorders associated with BPD than depression alone. It also takes about three months for benefit to appear, compared to the three to six weeks for depression.

=== Antipsychotics ===
The newer atypical antipsychotics are claimed to have an improved adverse effect profile than the typical antipsychotics. Antipsychotics are also sometimes used to treat distortions in thinking or false perceptions. One meta-analysis of two randomly controlled trials, four non-controlled open-label studies and eight case reports has suggested that several atypical antipsychotics, including olanzapine, clozapine, quetiapine and risperidone, may help BPD patients with psychotic-like, impulsive or suicidal symptoms. However, there are numerous adverse effects of antipsychotics, notably tardive dyskinesia (TD). Atypical antipsychotics are known for often causing considerable weight gain, with associated health complications.

=== Mood stabilizers ===
Mood stabilizers are anticonvulsant drugs used for both epilepsy and reduction in mood variations in patients with excessive and often dangerous mood variabilities. Often, the goal of the anticonvulsants are to bring certain areas of the brain to equilibrium and control outbursts and seizures. Mood stabilizers (used primarily to treat bipolar disorder) such as lithium or lamotrigine may be of some use to help depressed or labile periods, as well as rapid changes in mood. A random controlled trial by Lieb (2010) found mood stabilizer valproate semisodium showed a significant decrease in interpersonal conflicts and depression. It was also found that topiramate showed a significant decrease in interpersonal issues and depression. Lamotrigine showed a significant decrease in impulsivity and anger-related behaviors. Carbamazepine showed no significant effects on patients with BPD. Mood stabilizers are often used to treat comorbid disorders in BPD patients. There is currently no medicine with an overall significant effect on BPD as a whole.

== Services and recovery ==
Individuals with BPD sometimes use mental health services extensively. People with this diagnosis accounted for about 20 percent of psychiatric hospitalizations in one survey. The majority of BPD patients continue to use outpatient treatment in a sustained manner for several years, but the number using the more restrictive and costly forms of treatment, such as inpatient admission, declines with time. Experience of services varies. Assessing suicide risk can be a challenge for mental health services (and patients themselves tend to underestimate the lethality of self-injurious behaviours) with typically a chronically elevated risk of suicide much above that of the general population and a history of multiple attempts when in crisis.

Particular difficulties have been observed in the relationship between care providers and individuals diagnosed with BPD. A majority of psychiatric staff report finding individuals with BPD moderately to extremely difficult to work with, and more difficult than other client groups. On the other hand, those with the diagnosis of BPD have reported that the term "BPD" felt like a pejorative label rather than a helpful diagnosis, that self-destructive behaviour was incorrectly perceived as manipulative, and that they had limited access to care. Attempts are made to improve public and staff attitudes.

=== Combining pharmacotherapy and psychotherapy ===
In practice, psychotherapy and medication may often be combined, but there are limited data on clinical practice. Efficacy studies often assess the effectiveness of interventions when added to "treatment as usual" (TAU), which may involve general psychiatric services, supportive counselling, medication and psychotherapy.

One small study, which excluded individuals with a comorbid Axis 1 disorder, has indicated that outpatients undergoing dialectical behavioral therapy and taking the antipsychotic olanzapine show significantly more improvement on some measures related to BPD, compared to those undergoing DBT and taking a placebo pill, although they also experienced weight gain and raised cholesterol. Another small study found that patients who had undergone DBT and then took fluoxetine (Prozac) showed no significant improvements, whereas those who underwent DBT and then took a placebo pill did show significant improvements.

=== Difficulties in therapy ===
There can be unique challenges in the treatment of BPD, such as hospital care. In psychotherapy, a client may be unusually sensitive to rejection and abandonment and may react negatively (e.g., by harming themselves or withdrawing from treatment) if they sense this. In addition, clinicians may emotionally distance themselves from individuals with BPD for self-protection or due to the stigma associated with the diagnosis, leading to a self-fulfilling prophecy and a cycle of stigmatization to which both patient and therapist can contribute.

Some psychotherapies, including DBT, were developed partly to overcome problems with interpersonal sensitivity and maintaining a therapeutic relationship. Adherence to medication regimens is also a problem, due in part to adverse effects, with drop-out rates of between 50 percent and 88 percent in medication trials. Comorbid disorders, particularly substance use disorders, can complicate attempts to achieve remission.

=== Other strategies ===
Psychotherapies and medications form a part of the overall context of mental health services and psychosocial needs related to BPD. The evidence base is limited for both, and some individuals may forego them or not benefit (enough) from them. It has been argued that diagnostic categorization can have limited utility in directing therapeutic work in this area, and that in some cases it is only with reference to past and current relationships that "borderline" behavior can be understood as partly adaptive and how people can best be helped.

Numerous other strategies may be used, including alternative medicine techniques (see List of branches of alternative medicine); exercise and physical fitness, including team sports; occupational therapy techniques, including creative arts; having structure and routine to the days, particularly through employment – helping feelings of competence (e.g. self-efficacy), having a social role and being valued by others, boosting self-esteem.

Group-based psychological services encourage clients to socialize and participate in both solitary and group activities. These may be in day centers. Therapeutic communities are an example of this, particularly in Europe; although their usage has declined many have specialised in the treatment of severe personality disorder.

Psychiatric rehabilitation services aimed at helping people with mental health problems reduce psychosocial disability, engage in meaningful activities and avoid stigma and social exclusion may be of value to people who have BPD. There are also many mutual-support or co-counseling groups run by and for individuals with BPD. Services, or individual goals, are increasingly based on a recovery model that supports and emphasizes an individual's personal journey and potential.

Data indicate that the diagnosis of BPD is more variable over time than the DSM implies. Substantial percentages (for example around a third, depending on criteria) of people diagnosed with BPD achieve remission within a year or two. A longitudinal study found that, six years after being diagnosed with BPD, 56 percent showed good psychosocial functioning, compared to 26 percent at baseline. Although vocational achievement was more limited even compared to those with other personality disorders, those whose symptoms had remitted were significantly more likely to have a good relationship with a spouse/partner and at least one parent, good work/school performance, a sustained work/school history, good global functioning and good psychosocial functioning.

== See also ==
- List of investigational borderline personality disorder drugs
