= DMCPA =

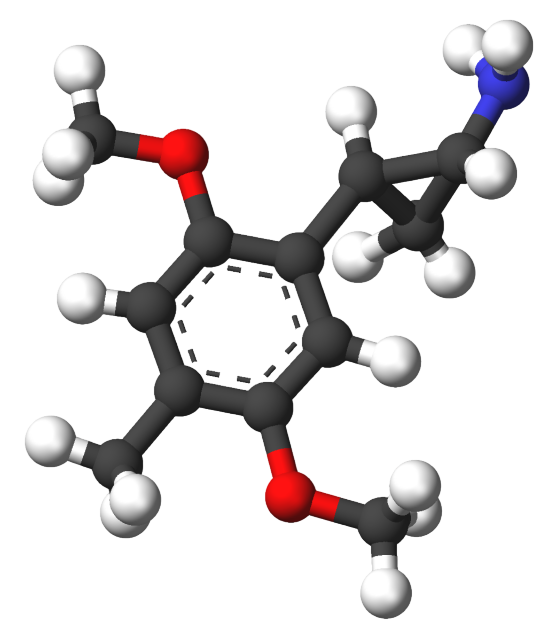

Clinical data
- Other names: 25D-CPA; 2,5-Dimethoxy-4-methylphenylcyclopropylamine; 4-Methyl-2,5-dimethoxyphenylcyclopropylamine
- Routes of administration: Oral
- Drug class: Serotonin 5-HT_{2A} receptor agonist; Serotonin receptor modulator; Serotonergic psychedelic; Hallucinogen
- ATC code: None

Pharmacokinetic data
- Onset of action: 1 hour
- Duration of action: 4–8 hours

Identifiers
- IUPAC name: 2-(2,5-dimethoxy-4-methylphenyl)cyclopropan-1-amine
- CAS Number: 714903-64-7
- PubChem CID: 3017965
- ChemSpider: 2285590
- UNII: U2YC8RFK7B
- ChEMBL: ChEMBL13530
- CompTox Dashboard (EPA): DTXSID10990120

Chemical and physical data
- Formula: C_{12}H_{17}NO_{2}
- Molar mass: 207.273 g·mol^{−1}
- 3D model (JSmol): Interactive image
- SMILES: O(c1c(cc(OC)c(c1)C2CC2N)C)C
- InChI: InChI=1S/C12H17NO2/c1-7-4-12(15-3)9(6-11(7)14-2)8-5-10(8)13/h4,6,8,10H,5,13H2,1-3H3; Key:HYVPPECPQRBJEQ-UHFFFAOYSA-N

DMCPA, also known as 2,5-dimethoxy-4-methylphenylcyclopropylamine, is a psychedelic drug of the phenethylamine, amphetamine, and phenylcyclopropylamine families related to DOM. It is a derivative of tranylcypromine and is the cyclized phenethylamine analogue of DOM in which the α and β positions have been connected with a carbon atom to form a cyclopropyl group.

== Use and effects ==
In his book PiHKAL (Phenethylamines I Have Known and Loved), Alexander Shulgin lists DMCPA's dose as 15 to 20 mg orally and its duration as 4 to 8 hours. Its onset is 1 hour. The effects of DMCPA have been reported to include psychedelic visuals such as visual movement, fantasy, eroticism, feeling decoupled from one's experience and environment, feeling like the aura before a seizure, lightheadedness, feeling loss of control and uncomfortable, muscle tremors, mild anorexia, bizarre and colorful dreams during subsequent sleep, and no next-day hangover. It was said to have too much in the way of physical side effects and hints of physical toxicity at the highest assessed dose.

== Pharmacology ==
=== Pharmacodynamics ===
The comprehensive receptor interactions of DMCPA have been studied. In contrast to tranylcypromine, it shows very weak activity as a monoamine oxidase inhibitor (MAOI).

== Chemistry ==
=== Synthesis ===
The chemical synthesis of DMCPA has been described.

=== Analogues ===
Analogues of DMCPA include 3,4,5-trimethoxytranylcypromine (TMT), tranylcypromine, and DOM, among others.

== History ==
DMCPA was first described in the scientific literature by at least 1974.

== Society and culture ==
=== Legal status ===
==== United Kingdom ====
This substance is a Class A drug in the Drugs controlled by the UK Misuse of Drugs Act.

== See also ==
- Substituted methoxyphenethylamine
- Cyclized phenethylamine
- Phenylcyclopropylamine
