= Essential thrombocythemia =

Overproduction of platelets in the bone marrow

- Other names: Essential thrombocythaemia, essential thrombocytosis, primary thrombocytosis
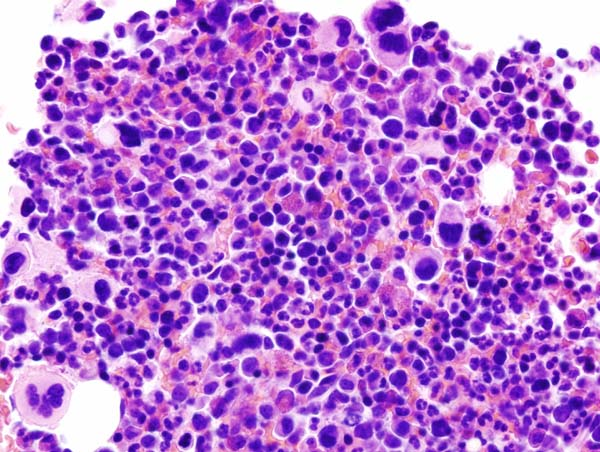
- Histopathological image representing a bone marrow aspirate in a patient with essential thrombocythemia.
- Specialty: Hematology
- Symptoms: Fatigue, insomnia, migraines, headache, and dizziness.
- Complications: Thrombosis, transient ischemic attack, acute coronary syndrome, Budd-Chiari syndrome.
- Causes: Overproduction of hematopoietic cells, genetic mutations.
- Diagnostic method: Clinical criteria.
- Differential diagnosis: Chronic myelogenous leukemia, myelodysplastic syndrome, polycythemia vera, primary myelofibrosis, secondary thrombocytosis.
- Treatment: Low-dose aspirin, plateletpheresis, cytoreductive therapy.
- Prognosis: Median survival is 18 years.
- Frequency: 0.6-2.5/100,000 cases per year.

In hematology, essential thrombocythemia (ET) is a rare chronic blood cancer (myeloproliferative neoplasm) characterised by the overproduction of platelets (thrombocytes) by megakaryocytes in the bone marrow. It may, albeit rarely, develop into acute myeloid leukemia or myelofibrosis. It is one of the blood cancers wherein the bone marrow produces too many white or red blood cells, or platelets.

== Signs and symptoms ==
Most people with essential thrombocythemia are without symptoms at the time of diagnosis, which is usually made after noting an elevated platelet level on a routine complete blood count (CBC). The most common symptoms are bleeding (due to dysfunctional platelets), blood clots (e.g., deep vein thrombosis or pulmonary embolism), fatigue, headache, nausea, vomiting, abdominal pain, visual disturbances, dizziness, fainting, and numbness in the extremities; the most common signs are increased white blood cell count, reduced red blood cell count, and an enlarged spleen.

== Cause ==
In ET, megakaryocytes are more sensitive to growth factors. Platelets derived from the abnormal megakaryocytes are activated, which, along with the elevated platelet count, contributes to the likelihood of forming blood clots. The increased possibility of bleeding when the platelet count is over 1 million is due to von Willebrand factor (vWF) sequestration by the increased mass of platelets, leaving insufficient vWF for platelet adhesion. A mutation in the JAK2 kinase (V617F) is present in 40–50% of cases and is diagnostic if present. JAK2 is a member of the Janus kinase family.

In 2013, two groups detected calreticulin mutations in a majority of JAK2-negative/MPL-negative patients with essential thrombocythemia and primary myelofibrosis, which makes CALR mutations the second most common in myeloproliferative neoplasms. All mutations (insertions or deletions) affected the last exon, generating a reading frame shift of the resulting protein, that creates a novel terminal sequence and causes a loss of endoplasmic reticulum KDEL retention signal.

There are three known genetic mutations that cause ET. The most common genetic mutation is a JAK2 mutation. Roughly 50% of the population of ET patients have this mutation. The JAK 2 gene signals a protein that promotes the growth of cells. The protein is part of a signaling pathway called the JAK/STAT pathway. The JAK2 protein controls the production of blood cells from hematopoietic stem cells which are located in the bone marrow and can eventually become platelets, red blood cells or white blood cells. Specifically in ET, a JAK2 mutation is acquired rather than inherited. The most common JAK2 mutation is V617F which is the replacement of a valine amino acid with phenylalanine amino acid at the 617 position, hence the name V617F. This mutation results in the JAK2 protein constantly being turned on, which leads to the overproduction of abnormal blood cells, in ET it is platelets or megakaryocytes. There is also another JAK2 mutation found in exon 12, however much less common.

There is also a small number of people who have a different mutation called CALR, which is abbreviated from calreticulin. CALR is a protein found in the endoplasmic reticulum (ER). Its purpose is to maintain calcium homeostasis and control protein folding. There are three parts to CALR including an amino acid domain, a proline rich P-domain, and a carboxyl domain. All of these parts facilitate the function of CALR. CALR mutation is caused by insertions or deletions of amino acids in exon 9 that cause a reading shift, which then leads to the formation of a novel C terminus. There are two common types of CALR mutations, type 1 and type 2. Type 1 mutations are a 52-bp deletion and type 2 mutations are a 5-bp insertion. In type 1 mutations, the negatively charged amino acids in the CALR C terminus are completely eliminated, and in the type 2 mutations, roughly half are eliminated. There are other mutations involving CALR, however these two are the most common. Apart from loosing its KDEL retention signal to the ER, this novel C terminus of CALR has a lower capability to bind calcium ions.

Lastly, the least common mutation found in patients with ET are MPL mutations. The MPL gene is responsible for making thrombopoietin receptor proteins which promote the growth and division of cells. This receptor protein is vital in producing platelets. There are various MPL mutations, but most typical are point mutations that cause amino acid changes. The MPL mutation activates the thrombopoietin receptor despite the absence of the ligand. This causes the constant proliferation of cells.

== Diagnosis ==
The following revised diagnostic criteria for essential thrombocythemia were proposed in 2005. The diagnosis requires the presence of both A criteria together with B3 to B6, or of criterion A1 together with B1 to B6. The criteria are as follows:

- A1. Platelet count > 400 × 10^{3}/μL for at least 2 months.
- A2. Acquired V617F JAK2 mutation present
- B1. No cause for a reactive thrombocytosis
  - normal inflammatory indices
- B2. No evidence of iron deficiency
  - stainable iron in the bone marrow or normal red cell mean corpuscular volume
- B3. No evidence of polycythemia vera
  - hematocrit < midpoint of normal range or normal red cell mass in presence of normal iron stores
- B4. No evidence of chronic myeloid leukemia
  - But the Philadelphia chromosome may be present in up to 10% of cases. Patients with the Philadelphia chromosome have a potential for the development of acute leukemia, especially acute lymphocytic leukemia.
- B5. No evidence of myelofibrosis
  - no collagen fibrosis and ≤ grade 2 reticulin fibrosis (using 0–4 scale)
- B6. No evidence of a myelodysplastic syndrome
  - no significant dysplasia
  - no cytogenetic abnormalities suggestive of myelodysplasia

== Treatment ==
=== Indications ===
Not all those affected will require treatment at presentation. Patients are usually designated as having a low or high risk of bleeding or developing blood clots based on their age, medical history, blood counts and their lifestyles. Low risk individuals are usually treated with aspirin, whereas those at high risk are treated with hydroxycarbamide, interferon-α or anagrelide. Currently unapproved but in late-stage clinical trials (NCT04254978) are agents that lower platelets such as bomedemstat.

=== Agents ===
Hydroxycarbamide, interferon-α and anagrelide can lower the platelet count. Low-dose aspirin is used to reduce the risk of blood clot formation unless the platelet count is very high, where there is a risk of bleeding from the disease, and hence this measure would be counter-productive as aspirin-use increases the risk of bleeding.

The PT1 study compared hydroxyurea plus aspirin to anagrelide plus aspirin as initial therapy for ET. Hydroxyurea treated patients had a lower incidence of arterial thrombosis, lower incidence of severe bleeding and lower incidence of transformation to myelofibrosis, but the risk of venous thrombosis was higher with hydroxycarbamide than with anagrelide. It is unknown whether the results are applicable to all ET patients. In people with symptomatic ET and extremely high platelet counts (exceeding 1 million), plateletpheresis can be used to remove platelets from the blood to reduce the risk of thrombosis.

== Prognosis ==
Essential thrombocythemia is sometimes described as a slowly progressive disorder with long asymptomatic periods punctuated by thrombotic or hemorrhagic events. However, well-documented medical regimens can reduce and control the number of platelets, which reduces the risk of these thrombotic or hemorrhagic events. The lifespan of a well-controlled ET person is well within the expected range for a person of similar age but without ET. ET is the myeloproliferative neoplasm least likely to progress to acute myeloid leukemia.

== Epidemiology ==
The incidence of ET is 0.6-2.5/100,000 per year, the median age at onset is 65–70 years and it is more frequent in females than in males. The incidence in children is 0.09/100,000 per year.

== Pregnancy ==
Hydroxycarbamide and anagrelide are contraindicated during pregnancy and nursing. Essential thrombocythemia can be linked with a three-fold increase in risk of miscarriage. Throughout pregnancy, close monitoring of the mother and fetus is recommended. Low-dose low molecular weight heparin (e.g. enoxaparin) may be used. For life-threatening complications, the platelet count can be reduced rapidly using plateletpheresis, a procedure that removes platelets from the blood and returns the remainder to the patient.

== In popular culture ==
Jill Kaplan, the female protagonist of The Pajama Diaries comic strip was diagnosed with essential thrombocythemia.
