= UM171 =

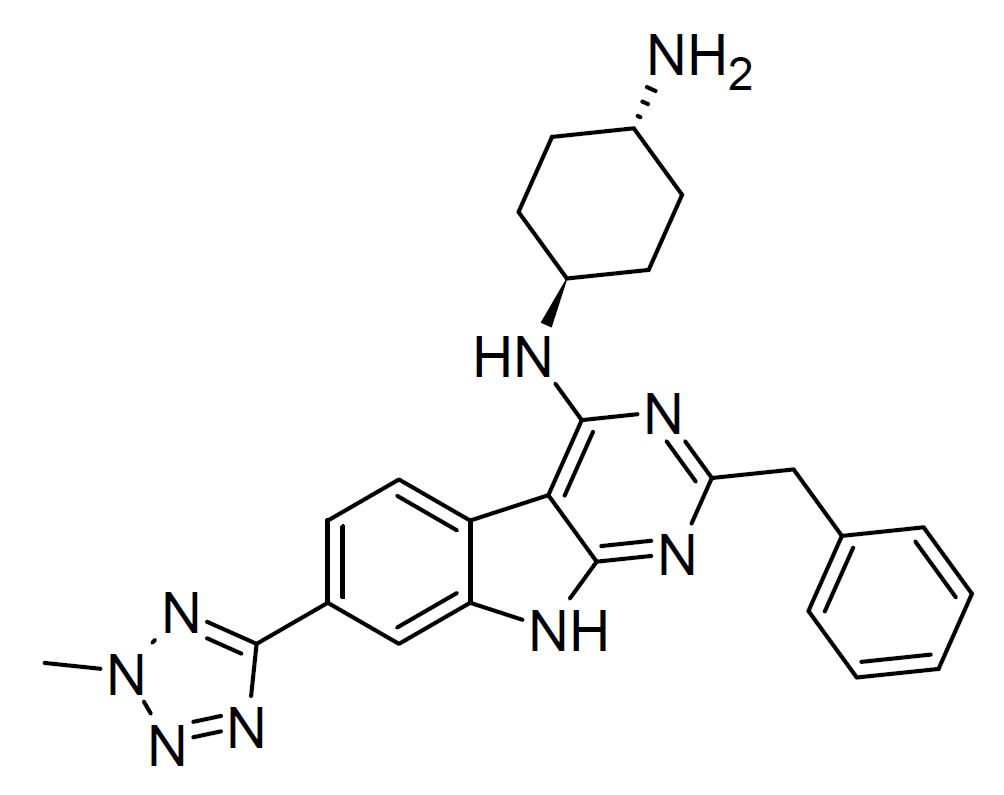

Clinical data
- Pregnancy category: d

Identifiers
- IUPAC name: trans-4-N-[2-benzyl-7-(2-methyltetrazol-5-yl)-9H-pyrimido[4,5-b]indol-4-yl]cyclohexane-1,4-diamine
- CAS Number: 1448724-09-1
- PubChem CID: 71714981
- UNII: 8XZ4J0KS9C

Chemical and physical data
- Formula: C_{25}H_{27}N_{9}
- Molar mass: 453.554 g·mol^{−1}
- 3D model (JSmol): Interactive image
- SMILES: CN1N=C(N=N1)C2=CC3=C(C=C2)C4=C(N3)N=C(N=C4NC5CCC(CC5)N)CC6=CC=CC=C6
- InChI: InChI=1S/C25H27N9/c1-34-32-23(31-33-34)16-7-12-19-20(14-16)28-25-22(19)24(27-18-10-8-17(26)9-11-18)29-21(30-25)13-15-5-3-2-4-6-15/h2-7,12,14,17-18H,8-11,13,26H2,1H3,(H2,27,28,29,30); Key:AZXXGVPWWKWGAE-UHFFFAOYSA-N

UM171 is a small molecule that was initially developed to facilitate the ex vivo expansion of hematopoietic stem and progenitor cells (HSPCs), but is now also being evaluated for potential anti-cancer activity.

UM171 was first identified in 2014 during a chemical screening campaign aimed at finding compounds that promote the ex vivo expansion of HSPCs. It was shown to markedly increase the number of transplantable stem cells derived from cord blood, which led to rapid preclinical and clinical testing in the context of hematopoietic stem cell transplantation.

More recently, UM171 has been investigated for its potential in cancer therapy. Since suppression of LSD1 activity has emerged as a promising strategy in oncology, UM171—which promotes the ubiquitin-dependent proteasomal degradation of the LSD1–CoREST complex—has shown anti-cancer effects in preclinical studies.

Mechanistic studies have shown that UM171 targets HDAC1 and HDAC2 within the LSD1/CoREST complex for degradation. Acting as a molecular glue, UM171 promotes the interaction of the CUL3–KBTBD4 E3 ligase with HDAC1/2, leading to their ubiquitination and selective degradation. This, in turn, destabilizes HDAC1/2-containing corepressors such as CoREST and MIER1. Although LSD1 and CoREST are also degraded, these effects occur secondarily and more slowly compared to the direct depletion of HDAC1/2.
