= Cyprolidol =

1960s experimental antidepressant drug

Clinical data
- Other names: IN 1060

Identifiers
- IUPAC name: diphenyl-(2-pyridin-4-ylcyclopropyl)methanol
- CAS Number: 7433-09-2 [2364-72-9] (hydrochloride), [4904-00-1] (±)-trans/(1RS,2SR)
- PubChem CID: 23287
- ChemSpider: 21778
- UNII: 7UQN2OJ7SM
- ChEMBL: ChEMBL2110906

Chemical and physical data
- Formula: C_{21}H_{19}NO
- Molar mass: 301.389 g·mol^{−1}
- 3D model (JSmol): Interactive image
- SMILES: C1C(C1C(C2=CC=CC=C2)(C3=CC=CC=C3)O)C4=CC=NC=C4
- InChI: InChI=1S/C21H19NO/c23-21(17-7-3-1-4-8-17,18-9-5-2-6-10-18)20-15-19(20)16-11-13-22-14-12-16/h1-14,19-20,23H,15H2; Key:KPUSUIKQQCFQCX-UHFFFAOYSA-N

Cyprolidol is an experimental antidepressant drug that was developed by Neisler Laboratories in the 1960s. It was never approved for human use.

In preclinical studies, cyprolidol demonstrated antidepressant effects in animal models that were qualitatively similar to those of imipramine, a well-established tricyclic antidepressant. However, clinical observations indicated that cyprolidol was less effective than imipramine in humans. Pharmacologically, cyprolidol also exhibited cardiovascular effects, such as blocking the tyramine-induced rise in blood pressure in anesthetized dogs while potentiating this response in conscious dogs, suggesting a complex interaction with adrenergic systems.

Its synthesis is similar to tranylcypromine, a monoamine oxidase inhibitor.

== Synthesis ==
The synthesis has been reported:

Cyprolidol synthesis

The cyclopropanation reaction between 4-vinylpyridine and ethyl diazoacetate affords ethyl 2-pyridin-4-ylcyclopropane-1-carboxylate. For steric reasons, the trans isomer is the thermodynamically favoured racemer, although epimerization may be needed to convert the cis isomer to the needed trans isomer. The Grignard reaction of two equivalents of phenylmagnesium bromide with the electrophilic ester completes the synthesis of cyprolidol.
