= Tudor domain =

TUDOR domain
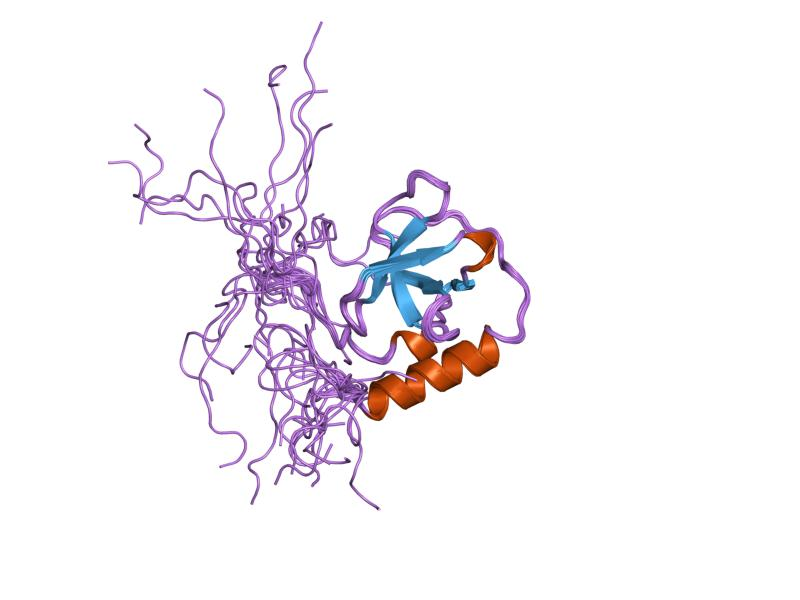
- Structure of a TUDOR domain.

Identifiers
- Symbol: TUDOR
- Pfam: PF00567
- Pfam clan: CL0049
- InterPro: IPR008191
- SMART: TUDOR
- PROSITE: PDOC50304
- SCOP2: 3fdr / SCOPe / SUPFAM
- CDD: cd04508
Available protein structures:
- PDB: 2diq, 2hqe, 2hqx, 2o4x, 2wac IPR008191 PF00567 (ECOD; PDBsum)
- AlphaFold: IPR008191; PF00567

In molecular biology, a Tudor domain is a conserved protein structural domain originally identified in the Tudor protein encoded in Drosophila. The Tudor gene was found in a Drosophila screen for maternal factors that regulate embryonic development or fertility. Mutations here are lethal for offspring, inspiring the name Tudor, as a reference to the Tudor King Henry VIII and the several miscarriages experienced by his wives.

== Structure ==
A Tudor domain is a protein region approximately 60 amino acids in length, which folds into an SH3-like structure with a five-stranded antiparallel beta-barrel form. Tudor domains can further be organized into functional units consisting of either a single Tudor domain, tandem Tudor domains, or hybrid Tudor domains consisting of two Tudor domains linked by an anti-parallel beta-sheet made from their shared second and third beta-strands. An essential component of the Tudor domain structure is the aromatic-binding cage formed by several (typically 4–5) aromatic amino acid residues.

== Interaction with methylated residues ==
Tudor domains exert their functions by recognizing and binding methylated lysine and arginine residues, allowing them to function as histone readers in an epigenetic context. This occurs through cation–pi interactions between the methylated Arg/Lys residue and the aromatic residues of the Tudor domain's aromatic-binding cage. Depending on the Tudor domain, this interaction can be methylation state-specific (mono-, di-, or trimethylation).

== Function ==
=== DNA transcription and modification ===
Tudor domain proteins are involved in epigenetic regulation and can alter transcription by recognizing post-translational histone modifications and as adaptor proteins. Recognition of methylated arginine and lysine histone residues results in the recruitment of downstream effectors, leading to chromatin silencing or activation depending on the Tudor domain protein and context. For example, the human TDRD3 protein binds methylated arginine residues and promotes transcription of estrogen-responsive elements. Conversely, the Polycomb-like protein (PCL) acts as an adaptor to recruit components of the Polycomb repressive complex 2 (PRC2), a histone H3K27 methyltransferase that represses transcription. Additionally, Tudor domain proteins can repress transcription by recruiting DNA-methyltransferases to promote DNA methylation and heterochromatin assembly. Tudor domain proteins also have the function of maintaining and propagating epigenetic modifications.

=== Genome stability ===
The Tudor domain is involved in the silencing of selfish genetic elements, such as retrotransposons. This functionality is performed both directly through Tudor-containing proteins, such as Tdrd7, as well as through piRNA synthesis. Tudor domains are essential in the localization of protein machinery involved in piRNA creation, such as localization of Yb protein to the Yb body, assembly of the pole plasm in Drosophila, and recruitment of proteins to load Piwi with piRNA.

=== DNA damage response ===
The human p53-binding protein 1 (TRP53BP1) is a Tudor domain protein involved in the DNA damage response (DDR) pathway, which functions to protect the genome from external stimuli. It is a cascade of events that senses damage through adaptor proteins and triggers responses including cell cycle arrest, DNA repair, transcriptional modifications, and apoptosis. TRP53BP1s Tudor domain mediates binding to sensors that accumulate at the sites of damage, and also functions as the adaptor promoting effector recruitment to the damaged sites. TRP53BP1 is essential for DDR as it plays a very complex role in the regulation and recruitment of multiple other proteins involved.

=== RNA metabolism ===
Tudor domain proteins involved in RNA metabolism have an extended Tudor domain of approximately 180 amino acids. These proteins contain RNA-binding motifs to target RNAs, or bind to dimethylated arginines of proteins bound to RNAs. These proteins regulate multiple aspects of RNA metabolism, including processing, stability, translation, and small RNA pathways. Specifically, the survival motor neuron (SMN) protein is a Tudor domain protein that mediates the assembly of snRNPs (small nuclear ribonucleoproteins), by binding snRNAs and recruiting asymmetrically dimethylated arginines of SM proteins that form the protein constituent of snRNPs. SMN promotes the maturation of snRNPs, which are essential for spliceosome assembly and intron removal.

== Examples ==
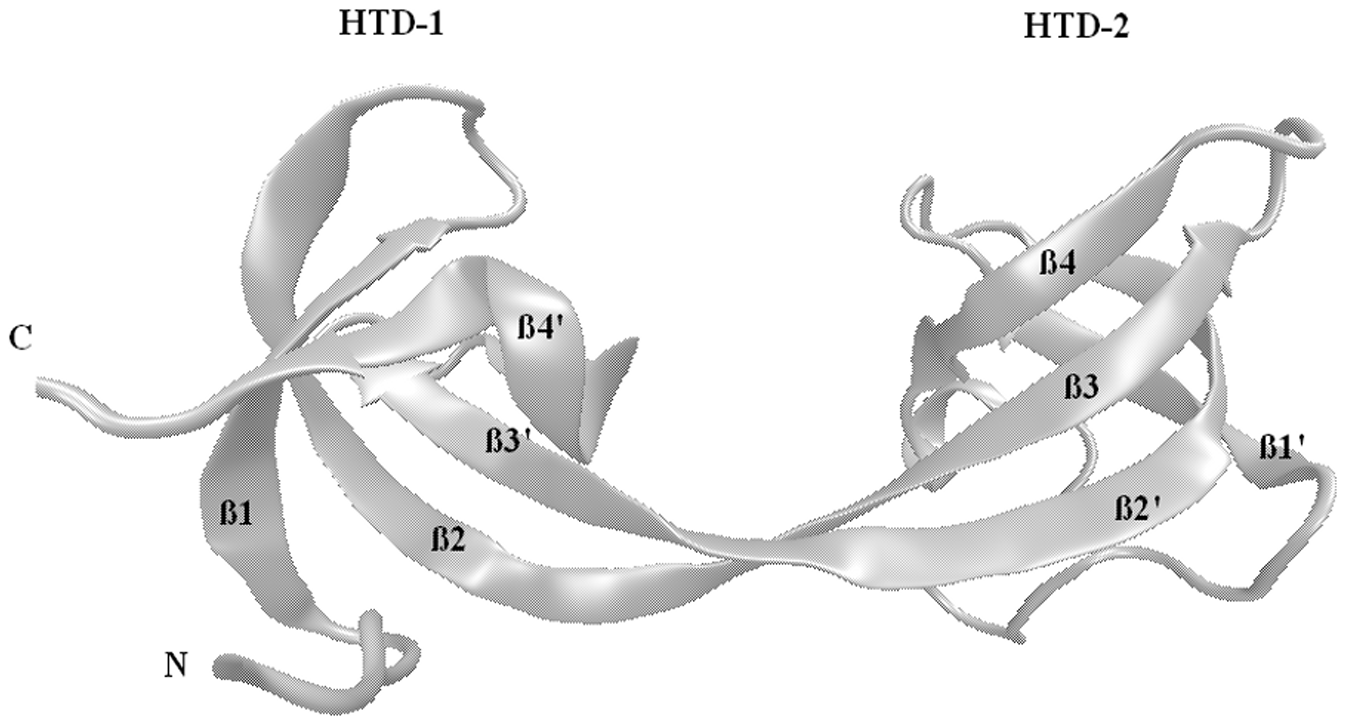
Hybrid Tudor domain in JMJD2A

The proteins TP53BP1 (Tumor suppressor p53-binding protein 1) and its fission yeast homolog Crb2 and JMJD2A (Jumonji domain containing 2A) contain either tandem or double Tudor domains and recognize methylated histones.

The structurally characterized Tudor domain in human SMN (survival of motor neuron) is a strongly bent anti-parallel β-sheet consisting of five β-strands with a barrel-like fold and recognizes symmetrically dimethylated arginine.

Other Tudor domain containing proteins include AKAP1 (A-kinase anchor protein 1) and ARID4A (AT rich interactive domain 4A) among others. A well known Tudor domain containing protein is Staphylococcal Nuclease Domain Containing 1 (SND1)/Tudor-SN/p100 co activator. SND1 is involved in RISC complex and interacts with AEG-1 oncogene. SND1 is also acts as an oncogene and plays a very important role in HCC and colon cancer. The SND1 Tudor domain binds to methylated arginine in the PIWIL1 protein. Tudor containing SND1 promotes tumor angiogenesis in human hepatocellular carcinoma through a novel pathway which involves NF-kappaB and miR-221. Tudor SND1 is also present in the Drosophila melanogaster.
