= KDM1A =

Protein found in humans

Identifiers
- Aliases: KDM1A, AOF2, BHC110, KDM1, LSD1, CPRF, lysine demethylase 1A
- External IDs: OMIM: 609132; MGI: 1196256; GeneCards: KDM1A
Available structures
PDB	Ortholog search: PDBe RCSB
PDB	List of PDB id codes 2COM, 2DW4, 2EJR, 2H94, 2HKO, 2IW5, 2L3D, 2UXN, 2UXX, 2V1D, 2X0L, 2XAF, 2XAG, 2XAH, 2XAJ, 2XAQ, 2XAS, 2Y48, 2Z3Y, 2Z5U, 3ABT, 3ZMS, 3ZMT, 3ZMU, 3ZMV, 3ZMZ, 3ZN0, 3ZN1, 4BAY, 4CZZ, 4KUM, 4UV8, 4UV9, 4UVA, 4UVB, 4UVC, 4UXN, 5AFW, 5L3D, 5L3B, 5IT3, 5L3C, 4XBF
Enzyme activity
EC #	BRENDA	ExPASy	KEGG	MetaCyc
1.14.11.65	↗	↗	↗	↗
1.14.99.66	↗	↗	↗	↗

Gene location (Human)
Chr.	Chromosome 1 (human)
Band	1p36.12	Start	23,019,443 bp
Band	1p36.12	End	23,083,689 bp

Gene location (Mouse)
Chr.	Chromosome 4 (mouse)
Band	4 D3|4 68.8 cM	Start	136,277,851 bp
Band	4 D3|4 68.8 cM	End	136,330,034 bp
RNA expression pattern
Bgee	Human / Mouse (ortholog); Top expressed in: ganglionic eminence; ventricular zone; right testis; left testis; beta cell; stromal cell of endometrium; anterior pituitary; right ovary; right uterine tube; left ovary / Top expressed in: urethra; epithelium of urethra; male urethra; tail of embryo; ganglionic eminence; epithelium of male urethra; female urethra; Gonadal ridge; epithelium of female urethra; genital tubercle; More reference expression data
BioGPS	n/a
Gene ontology
Molecular function	DNA binding; telomeric repeat-containing RNA binding; demethylase activity; telomeric DNA binding; flavin adenine dinucleotide binding; p53 binding; protein binding; androgen receptor binding; nuclear receptor coactivator activity; histone H3-methyl-lysine-4 demethylase activity; oxidoreductase activity; chromatin binding; histone deacetylase activity; histone demethylase activity; enzyme binding; MRF binding; transcription factor binding; histone H3-methyl-lysine-9 demethylase activity
Cellular component	DNA repair complex; nucleoplasm; nucleus; transcription regulator complex; protein-containing complex
Biological process	regulation of transcription, DNA-templated; negative regulation of intrinsic apoptotic signaling pathway in response to DNA damage by p53 class mediator; regulation of double-strand break repair via homologous recombination; cellular response to UV; histone H3-K4 demethylation; regulation of transcription by RNA polymerase II; negative regulation of DNA binding; protein demethylation; positive regulation of DNA-binding transcription factor activity; blood coagulation; negative regulation of protein binding; negative regulation of DNA-binding transcription factor activity; transcription, DNA-templated; multicellular organism development; negative regulation of DNA damage response, signal transduction by p53 class mediator; positive regulation of histone ubiquitination; cellular response to gamma radiation; negative regulation of transcription, DNA-templated; positive regulation of transcription by RNA polymerase II; alternative mRNA splicing, via spliceosome; cerebral cortex development; positive regulation of cell size; response to organic cyclic compound; guanine metabolic process; cellular response to cAMP; positive regulation of chromatin binding; histone deacetylation; positive regulation of neuron projection development; neuron maturation; response to fungicide; negative regulation of transcription by RNA polymerase II; histone H3-K9 demethylation; muscle cell development; chromatin organization; positive regulation of neuroblast proliferation; negative regulation of histone H3-K4 methylation; negative regulation of histone H3-K9 methylation; positive regulation of cold-induced thermogenesis; positive regulation of neural precursor cell proliferation; positive regulation of stem cell proliferation
Sources:Amigo / QuickGO
Orthologs
Databases	NCBI: entry; OMA: entry
Species	Human	Mouse
Entrez	23028	99982
Ensembl	ENSG00000004487	ENSMUSG00000036940
UniProt	O60341	Q6ZQ88
RefSeq (mRNA)	NM_001009999; NM_015013; NM_001363654	NM_133872; NM_001347221; NM_001356567
RefSeq (protein)	NP_001009999; NP_055828; NP_001350583	NP_001334150; NP_598633; NP_001343496
Location (UCSC)	Chr 1: 23.02 – 23.08 Mb	Chr 4: 136.28 – 136.33 Mb
PubMed search
- Wikidata
View/Edit Human	View/Edit Mouse

Lysine-specific histone demethylase 1A (LSD1) also known as lysine (K)-specific demethylase 1A (KDM1A) is a protein that in humans is encoded by the KDM1A gene. LSD1 is a flavin-dependent monoamine oxidase, which can demethylate mono- and di-methylated lysines, specifically histone 3, lysine 4 (H3K4). Other reported methylated lysine substrates such as histone H3K9 and TP53 have not been biochemically validated. This enzyme plays a critical role in oocyte growth, embryogenesis, hematopoiesis and tissue-specific differentiation. LSD1 was the first histone demethylase to be discovered more than 30 years ago.

== Structure ==
This gene encodes a nuclear protein containing a SWIRM domain, a FAD-binding motif, and an amine oxidase domain. This protein is a component of several complexes that include histone deacetylase and DNA methyltransferase 1, all of which are associated with the repression of gene transcription. It is now known that the LSD1 complex mediates a coordinated histone modification switch through these various enzymatic activities which in turn are recognized by histone "readers". The methylation of histone H3 at K4 can affect both the transcription of DNA and its replication.

== Mechanism of catalysis and protein function ==
LSD1 (lysine-specific demethylase 1), through a FAD-dependent oxidative reaction, specifically removes histone H3K4me2 to H3K4me1 or H3K4me0, but not H3K4me3.

The first step of the LSD1 catalytic reaction is the abstraction of hydride from the methyl of the H3K4 side chain N-methyl by FAD in the oxidized state that generates a stabilized methylene iminium ion. This is then hydrolyzed by a water molecule to give an unstable vicinal terminal hydroxyl amine that rapidly decomposes to yield the de-methylated lysine H3K4 molecule and formaldehyde. FAD is the reduced state reacts with molecular oxygen forming a covalent mono-hydroperoxide adduct which is then hydrolyzed by water to yield hydrogen peroxide regenerating the more stable FAD oxidized (resting) state. A highly conserved lysine (Lys661 in LSD1) at the active site in FAD-dependent amine oxidases is believed to assist in this reaction. The overall reaction stoichiometry thus involves the conversion of an N-methyl group by water and oxygen to give molecules of formaldehyde, hydrogen peroxide, and the product N-H terminus.

LSD1 cannot demethylate H3K4 trimethyl (N-tri-methyl-lysine) because the initial iminium species cannot be formed owing to a lack of an available lone electron pair at the N-center, essential for formation of the requisite stabilizing pi-system.

Given this mechanism, the mutant LSD1 with the Lys661Ala substitution is unlikely to adversely impact the interaction of LSD1 with various substrates, but rather leads to less efficient flavin recycling, which presumably then proceeds at the whim of any available non-specifically bound substitute water around that face of the FAD binding site. Thus, a mutation affecting K661 does retain some demethylase activity.

Even the structures of LSD1 at a 5 Å resolution clearly show how wide-ranging the protein-protein interactions are spread over the LSD1 Tower and SWIRM regions.

One method to examine the function of the LSD1 protein is to reduced the amount of KDM1A mRNA using a specific silencing RNA, so called siRNA knockdown. By this method, the loss of function shows a dependence of both hematopoietic stem and progenitor cells on LSD1 for self-renewal and maturation to fully differentiated blood cells. The interaction of LSD1 with the transcription factor GFI1B is particularly important for regulating the balance in stem cells between replication and self-renewal as well as the maturation the megakaryocyte-erythroid progenitors to megakaryocytes.

A complementary method to the "knockdown" method is pharmacologic inhibition of LSD1; many such inhibitors such as bomedemstat do not abrogate the scaffold function of LSD1 but rather inhibit the enzymatic activity as well as the ability of the LSD1 complex to bind transcription factors in the SNAIL family, most specifically GFI1 and GFI1B. Thus, these pharmacologic inhibitors have their greatest clinical utility in the treatment of hematologic diseases in which disruption of the LSD1-GFI1B or LSD1-GFI1 interaction is the therapeutic thesis for treatment. Indeed, the loss of the enzymatic activity of LSD1 has little effect on hematopoiesis unlike the effects of interfering with its binding to GFI1/1B.

== Interactions ==
LSD1 has many different protein binding partners in a cell- and developmentally-specific manner. Both its enzymatic activity and function as a scaffold are important depending on the cellular context. Indeed, in acute myeloid leukemia (AML), the interaction of LSD1 and GFI1B was definitively demonstrated to be necessary for the proliferation of leukemic initiating cells, while the LSD1 demethylase activity was not essential for this phenotype.

LSD1 can be a subunit of the NuRD complex and, and as such, participates in the gene expression programs associated with metastasis in breast cancer. There is also evidence that the interaction of LSD1 with nuclear GSK3β facilitates progression of certain cancers. High levels of nuclear GSK3β were found to promote the binding of LSD1 to the deubiquitinase, USP22, which prevented the degradation of LSD1 allowing LSD1 to accumulate to high levels. The accumulation of LSD1 has been correlated with tumor progression in certain cancers, including glioblastoma, leukemia, and osteosarcoma.

== Role in development ==
LSD1 appears to play an important role in the epigenetic "reprogramming" that occurs when sperm and egg unite to form the zygote. Deletion of KDM1A impairs the growth and differentiation of embryonic stem cells. Deletion of the mouse ortholog, Kdm1a, has an embryonic lethal phenotype; embryos do not progress beyond gestational Day 7.5.

== Clinical significance ==
As mentioned above, in several cancers, higher levels of expression of LSD1 are correlated with poorer outcomes suggesting LSD1 inhibition could be a part of an anti-neoplastic regimen. KDM1A has been found to be overexpressed in bladder, lung, and colorectal cancers. Inhibitors of LSD1 are being clinically tested for the treatment of extensive-disease small cell lung cancer, castrate-resistant prostate cancer, and acute meyloid leukemia. Catalytic inhibitors of LSD1 such as bomedemstat, iadademstat, phenelzine, pulrodemstat, seclidemstat, and tranylcypromine are in clinical development for the treatment of hematologic malignancies including acute meyloid leukemeia and, for bomedemstat, the myeloproliferative neoplasms. Given LSD1 is critical for the maturation of megakaryocytes, the bone marrow cells that produce platelets, LSD1 is well-suited as a target for the treatment of essential thrombocythemia, an indication currently in development for bomedemstat by Imago BioSciences. Inc.

== Mutations ==
De novo mutations in KDM1A have been reported in three patients with developmental delays complementing reports that loss-of-function mutations in SETD1A, a histone H3K4 methyltransferase, contributes to the risk of schizophrenia. All documented mutations are missense substitutions. LSD1 is rarely found to be mutated in cancer.

== See also ==
- Histone methylation
- UM171
