= Zavondemstat =

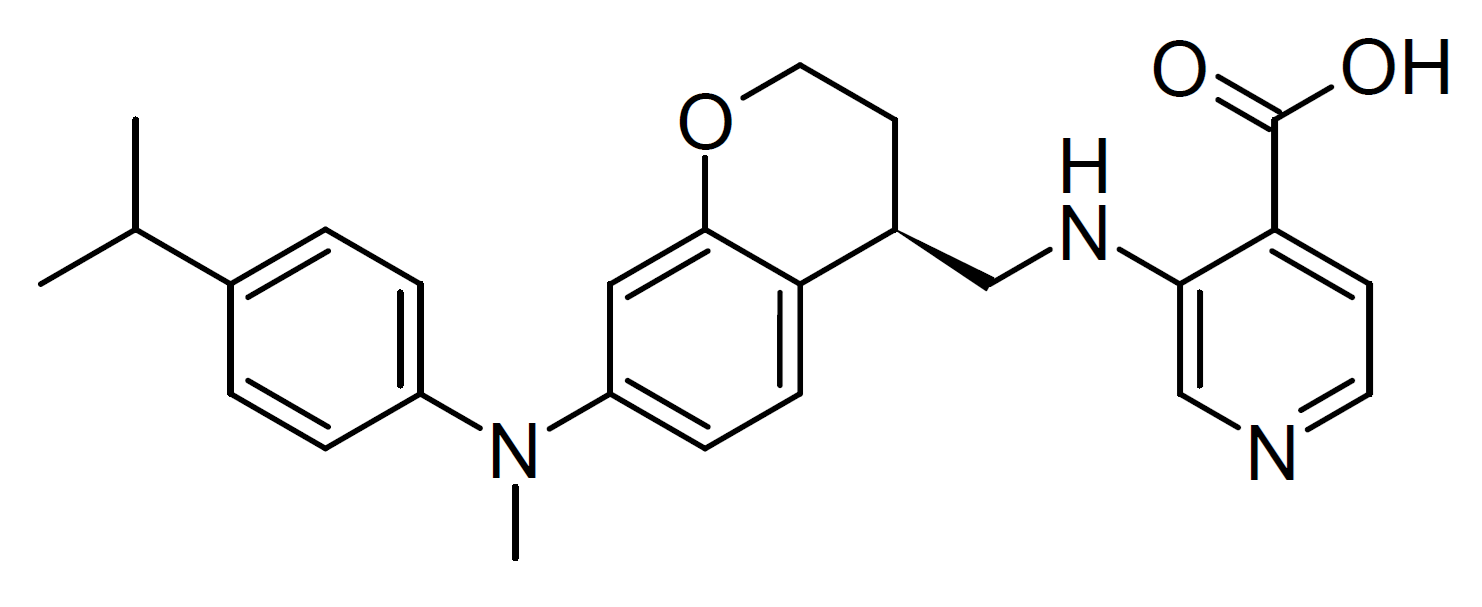

Clinical data
- Drug class: KDM4 inhibitor

Identifiers
- IUPAC name: 3-[[(4R)-7-(N-methyl-4-propan-2-ylanilino)-3,4-dihydro-2H-chromen-4-yl]methylamino]pyridine-4-carboxylic acid
- CAS Number: 1851412-93-5
- PubChem CID: 118597685
- DrugBank: DB21608
- ChemSpider: 128922294
- UNII: 4L3YJL2P4P
- ChEMBL: ChEMBL5314494

Chemical and physical data
- Formula: C_{26}H_{29}N_{3}O_{3}
- Molar mass: 431.536 g·mol^{−1}
- 3D model (JSmol): Interactive image
- SMILES: CC(C)C1=CC=C(C=C1)N(C)C2=CC3=C(C=C2)[C@@H](CCO3)CNC4=C(C=CN=C4)C(=O)O
- InChI: InChI=1S/C26H29N3O3/c1-17(2)18-4-6-20(7-5-18)29(3)21-8-9-22-19(11-13-32-25(22)14-21)15-28-24-16-27-12-10-23(24)26(30)31/h4-10,12,14,16-17,19,28H,11,13,15H2,1-3H3,(H,30,31)/t19-/m0/s1; Key:NDVITLLKZQXKGU-IBGZPJMESA-N

Zavondemstat (TACH101, QC8222) is a drug which acts as an inhibitor of the enzyme lysine-specific demethylase 4 (KDM4). It is described as a pan-KDM4 inhibitor, being active at all four isoforms KDM4A, KDM4B, KDM4C and KDM4D, which show functional redundancy so older inhibitors selective for just one isoform have failed to be effective. Zavondemstat is being researched for the treatment of certain forms of cancer and is in early stage clinical trials.
