= Seclidemstat =

Clinical data
- Other names: SP-2577
- Drug class: LSD1 inhibitor

Identifiers
- IUPAC name: N-[(E)-1-(5-chloro-2-hydroxyphenyl)ethylideneamino]-3-(4-methylpiperazin-1-yl)sulfonylbenzamide
- CAS Number: 1423715-37-0
- PubChem CID: 135565033
- ChemSpider: 64853793
- UNII: TYH386V3WJ
- KEGG: D12577
- ChEMBL: ChEMBL4297641

Chemical and physical data
- Formula: C_{20}H_{23}ClN_{4}O_{4}S
- Molar mass: 450.94 g·mol^{−1}
- 3D model (JSmol): Interactive image
- SMILES: C/C(=N\NC(=O)C1=CC(=CC=C1)S(=O)(=O)N2CCN(CC2)C)/C3=C(C=CC(=C3)Cl)O
- InChI: InChI=InChI=1S/C20H23ClN4O4S/c1-14(18-13-16(21)6-7-19(18)26)22-23-20(27)15-4-3-5-17(12-15)30(28,29)25-10-8-24(2)9-11-25/h3-7,12-13,26H,8-11H2,1-2H3,(H,23,27)/b22-14+; Key:MVSQDUZRRVBYLA-HYARGMPZSA-N

Seclidemstat is an investigational new drug that is being evaluated for the treatment of cancer. It is a small-molecule inhibitor of lysine-specific demethylase 1 (LSD1, KDM1A).
