= Bomedemstat =

Chemical compound

Clinical data
- Other names: IMG-7289

Identifiers
- IUPAC name: N-[(2S)-5-[[(1R,2S)-2-(4-fluorophenyl)cyclopropyl]amino]-1-(4-methylpiperazin-1-yl)-1-oxopentan-2-yl]-4-(triazol-1-yl)benzamide
- CAS Number: 1990504-34-1
- PubChem CID: 122460381
- DrugBank: DB15126
- ChemSpider: 75531282
- UNII: Y2T4ALDEAT
- ChEMBL: ChEMBL4297289

Chemical and physical data
- Formula: C_{28}H_{34}FN_{7}O_{2}
- Molar mass: 519.625 g·mol^{−1}
- 3D model (JSmol): Interactive image
- SMILES: CN1CCN(CC1)C(=O)[C@H](CCCN[C@@H]2C[C@H]2C3=CC=C(C=C3)F)NC(=O)C4=CC=C(C=C4)N5C=CN=N5
- InChI: InChI=1S/C28H34FN7O2/c1-34-15-17-35(18-16-34)28(38)25(3-2-12-30-26-19-24(26)20-4-8-22(29)9-5-20)32-27(37)21-6-10-23(11-7-21)36-14-13-31-33-36/h4-11,13-14,24-26,30H,2-3,12,15-19H2,1H3,(H,32,37)/t24-,25-,26+/m0/s1; Key:KQKBMHGOHXOHTD-KKUQBAQOSA-N

Bomedmestat (USAN) is an investigational drug under development by Imago BioSciences for the treatment of myeloproliferative neoplasms including essential thrombocythemia, polycythemia vera, myelofibrosis and small-cell lung cancer.

By exploiting the effects of LSD1 inhibition on megakaryocyte maturation and platelet production, Bomedemstat’s development has become focused on chronic myeloproliferative neoplasms, especially essential thrombocythaemia. Its platelet-lowering activity, which can cause dose-limiting thrombocytopenia when treating other diseases such as acute myeloid leukemia (AML), provides a therapeutic rationale for treatting essential thrombocythaemia. Bomedemstat illustrates how an on-target toxicity (suppression of platelet production), can be therapeutically exploited in diseases characterized by excess platelet production.

== History ==
Bomedmestat, also known as IMG-7289 or MRK3543, the bis-tosylate salt of IMG-241 MRK3543, was invented by John McCall, Hugh Young Rienhoff, Jr. and Michael Clare in 2014. The original composition-of-matter patent application was filed in 2014. and issued as US patent US-20150299151-A1 followed by other issued patents on polymorphs, salt forms and methods of manufacture.

Merck (Merck Sharp and Dohme) acquired Imago BioSciences with the rights to develop bomedemstat in January 2023.

== Mechanism of action ==
Bomedemstat was developed to inhibit the human enzyme lysine-specific demethylase-1 (LSD1 or KDM1A EC:1.14.99.66), an oxidating enzyme that mediates demethylation of lysine 4 of histone H3 (H3K4) mono- and di-methyl (H3K4me1 and H3K4me2), modifications known as epigenetics marks; histone H3 H3K4me1/m2 marks are generally associated with repression of DNA transcription. Identified as a histone demethylase in 2004, LSD1 demethylates H3K4me1 and H3K4me2 but not tri-methylated H3K4. Other methylated protein substrates of LSD1 have been reported but their physiologic or pathologic significance have not yet been biochemically validated.

Bomedemstat is an irreversible inhibitor of LSD1, a protein that coordinates flavine adenine dinucleotide (FAD), a co-factor essential for the oxidative demethylation reaction. The first step in the catalytic reaction of LSD1 involves the abstraction of hydride from the target methyl of the H3K4 sidechain N-methyl by the oxidized state of a non-covalently bound FAD prosthetic group at the LSD1 active site to give a stabilized methylene iminium ion. This is then hydrolyzed by a water molecule to give an unstable vicinal terminal hydroxyl amine which rapidly decomposes to yield the de-methylated lysine H3K4 molecule and formaldehyde, which diffuses away and is subsequently metabolized by aldehyde dehydrogenase. The now-reduced FAD at the active site reacts with a molecule of oxygen forming a covalent mono-hydroperoxide adduct which is then hydrolyzed by water to yield hydrogen peroxide, and in so doing regenerates the more stable FAD oxidized (resting) state. A highly conserved lysine (Lys661 in LSD1) at the active site in FAD-dependent amine oxidases is believed to assist in this reaction. The overall reaction stoichiometry thus involves the conversion of an N-methyl group by water and oxygen to give molecules of formaldehyde, hydrogen peroxide, and the product N-H terminus.

LSD1 cannot demethylate H3K4 trimethyl (N-tri-methyl-lysine) because the initial iminium species cannot be formed owing to a lack of an available lone electron pair at the N-center, essential for formation of the requisite stabilizing pi-system.

In the irreversible inhibition of LSD1 by bomedemstat, the initial hydride abstraction event by the oxidized FAD center targets the free cyclopropyl methylene generating an unstable carbo-cation which rapidly rearranges to form an unbound but stabilized conjugated iminium cation intermediate. That species is then hydrolytically cleaved by water to give free amine and cinnamaldehyde fragments. The reduced FAD state is converted back to its normal resting oxidized state by molecular oxygen with the production of hydrogen peroxide while the larger cinnamaldehyde fragment, rather than diffusing away from the active site, is able to react in situ with the oxidized FAD to form a stable covalent adduct, effectively locking the LSD1/CoREST complex into a permanently inactivated state.

== Research ==
After extensive pre-clinical testing, San Francisco-based Imago BioSciences sponsored the first human trial of bomedemstat in 2016 for the treatment of high-risk myelodysplastic syndrome and acute myeloid leukemia (AML) that was either refractory to available therapies or relapsed from treatment. The study was conducted entirely in Australia. A second Imago-sponsored clinical study of bomedemstat was begun in patients with myelofibrosis who had failed the standard-of-care treatment. The results of this global study have been presented at the American Society of Hematology, the European Hematology Association and other important forums of hematologic research. A third Imago-sponsored global clinical trial for the treatment of essential thrombocythemia was begun in 2020. The results of this global study have also been presented at the American Society of Hematology and the European Hematology Association. A fourth trial begun in 2023 for the treatment of polycythemia vera is ongoing.

Several other investigator-initiated studies of bomedemstat either as monotherapy or in combination with other agents for hematologic malignancies or solid tumors are underway.
