= GFI1B =

Protein-coding gene in the species Homo sapiens

Identifiers
- Aliases: GFI1B, BDPLT17, ZNF163B, growth factor independent 1B transcriptional repressor
- External IDs: OMIM: 604383; MGI: 1276578; GeneCards: GFI1B

Gene location (Human)
Chr.	Chromosome 9 (human)
Band	9q34.13	Start	132,944,000 bp
Band	9q34.13	End	132,991,687 bp

Gene location (Mouse)
Chr.	Chromosome 2 (mouse)
Band	2|2 A3	Start	28,499,462 bp
Band	2|2 A3	End	28,511,994 bp
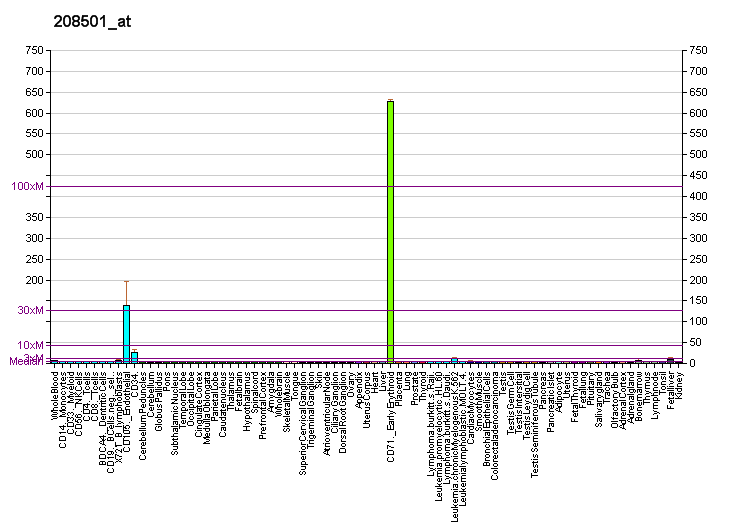
RNA expression pattern
Bgee	Human / Mouse (ortholog); Top expressed in: sperm; trabecular bone; monocyte; bone marrow; blood; left testis; right testis; granulocyte; testicle; bone marrow cell / Top expressed in: fetal liver hematopoietic progenitor cell; embryo; tibiofemoral joint; yolk sac; spleen; blood; tail of embryo; bone marrow; zygote; embryo; More reference expression data
BioGPS	More reference expression data
Gene ontology
Molecular function	DNA binding; protein binding; metal ion binding; nucleic acid binding; DNA-binding transcription factor activity, RNA polymerase II-specific
Cellular component	nuclear matrix; nucleus; transcription regulator complex
Biological process	multicellular organism development; cell population proliferation; regulation of transcription, DNA-templated; negative regulation of transcription by RNA polymerase II; transcription by RNA polymerase II; transcription, DNA-templated; chromatin organization; negative regulation of G1/S transition of mitotic cell cycle
Sources:Amigo / QuickGO
Orthologs
Databases	NCBI: entry; OMA: entry
Species	Human	Mouse
Entrez	8328	14582
Ensembl	ENSG00000165702	ENSMUSG00000026815
UniProt	Q5VTD9	O70237
RefSeq (mRNA)	NM_001135031; NM_004188; NM_001371908; NM_001377304; NM_001377305	NM_001160406; NM_008114
RefSeq (protein)	NP_001128503; NP_004179; NP_001358837; NP_001364233; NP_001364234	NP_001153878; NP_032140
Location (UCSC)	Chr 9: 132.94 – 132.99 Mb	Chr 2: 28.5 – 28.51 Mb
PubMed search
- Wikidata
View/Edit Human	View/Edit Mouse

Zinc finger protein Gfi-1b is a protein that in humans is encoded by the GFI1B gene.
