= List of investigational borderline personality disorder drugs =

This is a list of investigational borderline personality disorder drugs, or drugs that are currently under development for clinical use in the treatment of borderline personality disorder (BPD) but are not yet approved.

Chemical/generic names are listed first, with developmental code names, synonyms, and brand names in parentheses.

This list was last comprehensively updated in March 2025. It is likely to become outdated with time.

== Under development ==
=== Phase 3 ===
- Quetiapine (Seroquel) – atypical antipsychotic (non-selective monoamine receptor modulator)

=== Phase 2 ===
- BI-1358894 – transient receptor potential channel TRPC4 and TRPC5 inhibitor
- Lumateperone – atypical antipsychotic (non-selective monoamine receptor modulator)
- Psilocybin – non-selective serotonin receptor agonist and psychedelic hallucinogen
- Vafidemstat (ORY-2001) – lysine-specific demethylase 1 (LSD1; KDM1A) and monoamine oxidase B (MAO-B) inhibitor

== Not under development ==
=== Development discontinued ===
- Brexpiprazole (Rexulti) – atypical antipsychotic (non-selective monoamine receptor modulator)
- Citalopram (Celexa) – selective serotonin reuptake inhibitor

=== Formal development never or not yet started ===
- Other serotonergic psychedelics and entactogens (e.g., LSD, midomafetamine (MDMA))

== Clinically used drugs ==
=== Off-label drugs ===
- Anticonvulsants (e.g., lamotrigine, topiramate, valproic acid)
- Antidepressants (e.g., selective serotonin reuptake inhibitors (SSRIs))
- Atypical antipsychotics (e.g., aripiprazole, clozapine, olanzapine, quetiapine, risperidone, ziprasidone)
- Benzodiazepines (e.g., alprazolam, clonazepam, diazepam, lorazepam)
- Mood stabilizers (e.g., lithium)
- Omega-3 fatty acids
- Sedative antihistamines (e.g., promethazine)

== See also ==
- List of investigational drugs
- List of investigational aggression drugs
