= KDM4A =

Enzyme

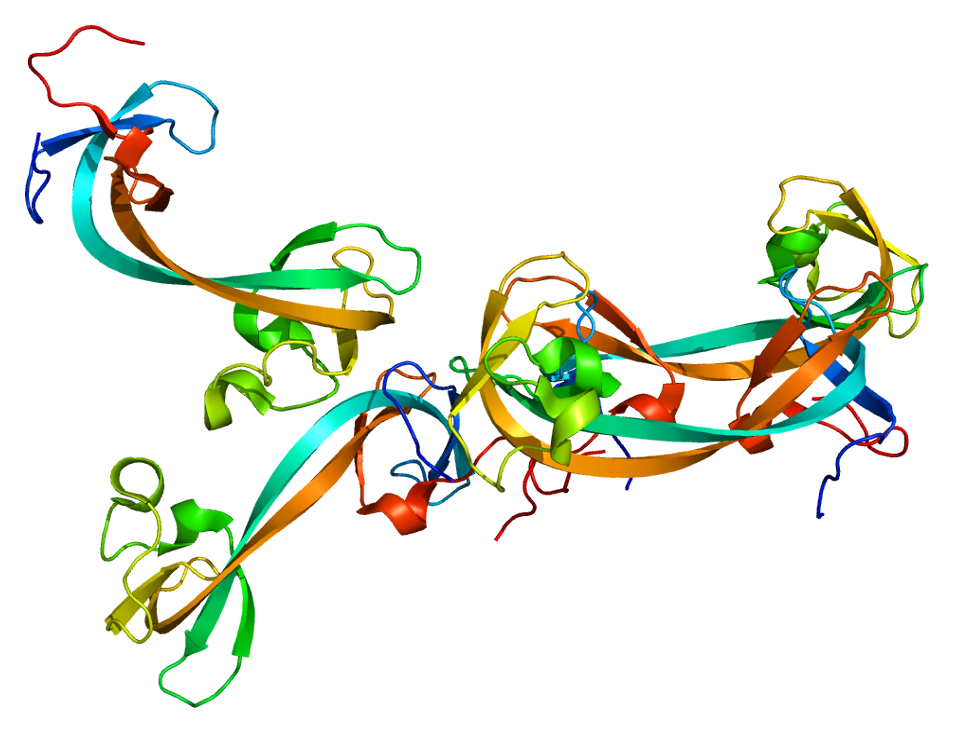

Identifiers
- Aliases: KDM4A, JHDM3A, JMJD2, JMJD2A, TDRD14A, lysine demethylase 4A
- External IDs: OMIM: 609764; MGI: 2446210; GeneCards: KDM4A
Available structures
| PDB | Ortholog search: PDBe RCSB |
| PDB | List of PDB id codes 2GF7, 2GFA, 2GP3, 2GP5, 2OQ6, 2OQ7, 2OS2, 2OT7, 2OX0, 2P5B, 2PXJ, 2Q8C, 2Q8D, 2Q8E, 2QQR, 2QQS, 2VD7, 2WWJ, 2YBK, 2YBP, 2YBS, 3NJY, 3PDQ, 3RVH, 3U4S, 4AI9, 4BIS, 4GD4, 4URA, 4V2V, 4V2W, 5D6X, 5F5I, 5A7S, 5F2S, 5A7N, 5A7Q, 5A7O, 5F2W, 5D6W, 5F32, 5FPV, 5A7P, 5A7W, 5F3I, 5A80, 5F37, 5F3E, 5F39, 5F3G, 5F3C, 5D6Y, 5FYC, 5FYI, 5FY8, 5FWE, 5ANQ, 5FYH |
Enzyme activity
| EC # | BRENDA | ExPASy | KEGG | MetaCyc |
|---|---|---|---|---|
| 1.14.11.66 | ↗ | ↗ | ↗ | ↗ |
| 1.14.11.69 | ↗ | ↗ | ↗ | ↗ |

Gene location (Human)
| Chr. | Chromosome 1 (human) |
| Band | 1p34.2-p34.1 | Start | 43,650,149 bp |
| Band | 1p34.2-p34.1 | End | 43,705,518 bp |

Gene location (Mouse)
| Chr. | Chromosome 4 (mouse) |
| Band | 4 D2.1|4 54.31 cM | Start | 117,994,154 bp |
| Band | 4 D2.1|4 54.31 cM | End | 118,037,240 bp |
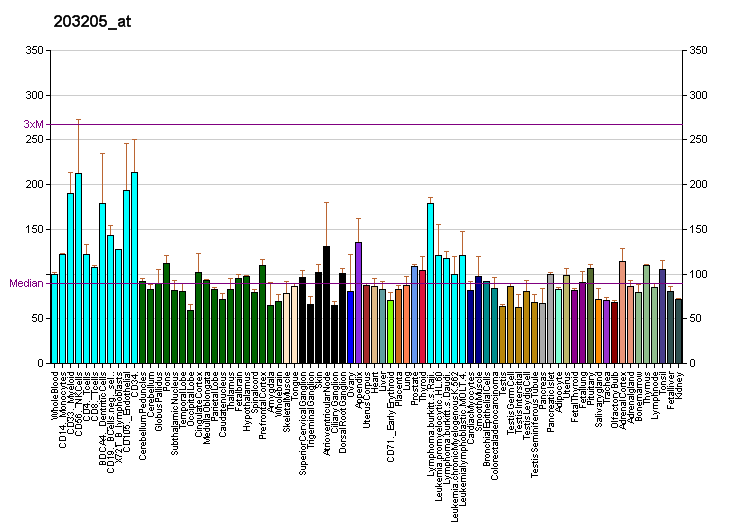

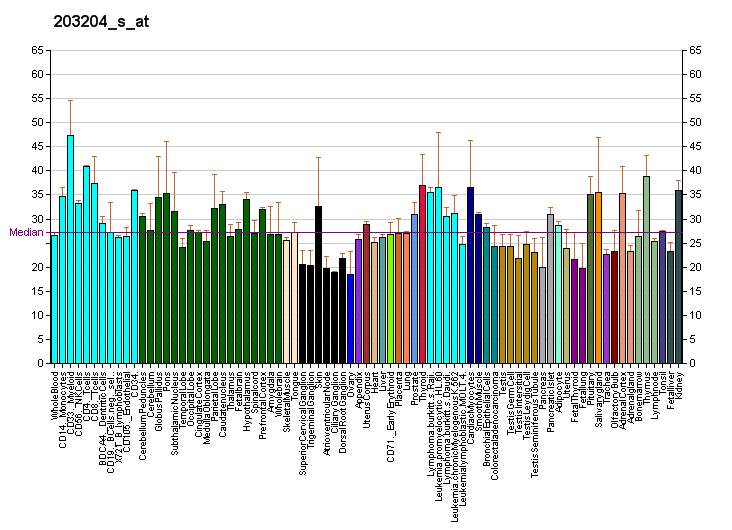
RNA expression pattern
| Bgee | Human / Mouse (ortholog); Top expressed in: ganglionic eminence; ventricular zone; right adrenal cortex; mucosa of transverse colon; rectum; left adrenal gland; islet of Langerhans; stromal cell of endometrium; left adrenal cortex; smooth muscle tissue / Top expressed in: hand; ventricular zone; granulocyte; molar; epithelium of small intestine; ganglionic eminence; neural layer of retina; foot; otolith organ; utricle; More reference expression data |
| BioGPS | More reference expression data |
Gene ontology
| Molecular function | dioxygenase activity; metal ion binding; methylated histone binding; protein binding; histone H3-methyl-lysine-36 demethylase activity; oxidoreductase activity; ubiquitin protein ligase binding; histone H3-methyl-lysine-9 demethylase activity; zinc ion binding; histone demethylase activity; DNA-binding transcription repressor activity, RNA polymerase II-specific; chromatin binding |
| Cellular component | nucleoplasm; fibrillar center; cytosol; nucleus; pericentric heterochromatin; cytoplasm; histone methyltransferase complex |
| Biological process | histone demethylation; regulation of transcription, DNA-templated; negative regulation of gene expression; transcription, DNA-templated; viral process; negative regulation of transcription, DNA-templated; negative regulation of autophagy; histone H3-K9 demethylation; histone H3-K36 demethylation; chromatin organization; negative regulation of transcription by RNA polymerase II; positive regulation of gene expression; cardiac muscle hypertrophy in response to stress; response to nutrient levels; positive regulation of neuron differentiation; negative regulation of astrocyte differentiation; negative regulation of cell death; negative regulation of histone H3-K9 trimethylation; chromatin remodeling |
Sources:Amigo / QuickGO
Orthologs
| Databases | NCBI: entry; OMA: entry |
| Species | Human | Mouse |
| Entrez | 9682 | 230674 |
| Ensembl | ENSG00000066135 | ENSMUSG00000033326 |
| UniProt | O75164 | Q8BW72 |
| RefSeq (mRNA) | NM_014663 | NM_001161823; NM_172382 |
| RefSeq (protein) | NP_055478 | NP_001155295; NP_759014 |
| Location (UCSC) | Chr 1: 43.65 – 43.71 Mb | Chr 4: 117.99 – 118.04 Mb |
| PubMed search |
- Wikidata
| View/Edit Human | View/Edit Mouse |

Lysine-specific demethylase 4A is an enzyme that in humans is encoded by the KDM4A gene.

== Structure ==
This gene is a member of the Jumonji domain 2 (JMJD2) family and encodes a protein with a JmjN domain, a JmjC domain, a JD2H domain, two TUDOR domains, and two PHD-type zinc fingers. This nuclear protein belongs to the alpha-ketoglutarate-dependent hydroxylase superfamily.

== Function ==
It functions as a trimethylation-specific demethylase, converting specific trimethylated histone on histone H3 lysine 9 and 36 residues to the dimethylated form and lysine 9 dimethylated residues to monomethyl, and as a transcriptional repressor.

== Clinical significance ==
Alterations in this gene have been found associated with chromosomal instability that leads to cancer.

In humans, the role of Kdm4a as an oncogene, or cancer associated gene, is well established. It is implicated in prostate tumors, where it is overexpressed, and stimulates cell proliferation in colon cancer cells, where it promotes formation of the tumor itself. In lung cancer cell lines, where Kdm4a is also overexpressed, it coordinates with other oncogenes (like Ras) to transform normal cells into cancerous cells by inhibiting tumor suppressor pathways such as p53. Suppression of Kdm4a in breast cancer cell lines has shown to reduce cancer cell proliferation through cell cycle arrest, and decrease tumor migration and invasion.

== Animal studies ==
In mice models, Kdm4a influences various processes leading up to implantation of the embryo. The expression of this gene is observed in all tissues critical to the female reproductive system, including the hypothalamus, pituitary, ovary, oviducts, and uterus, as well as embryonic development. A knockout of this gene in female mice has shown to negatively interfere with maintaining a maternal uterine environment suitable to receive and implant the blastocyst. It also interferes in the early embryonic development of the female mice's pups prior to implantation, leading to infertility. While mechanisms of normal ovulation and fertilization remain unaffected, infertility may also be partly due to decreased levels of Prolactin, a hormone crucial during the process of pregnancy. A knockout of Kdm4a has no effect on the fertility or viability of male pups.
