= Thrombopoietic agent =

Drugs helps in inducing growth and maturation of megakaryocytes

Thrombopoietic agents are drugs that induce the growth and maturation of megakaryocytes. Some of them are currently in clinical use: romiplostim, eltrombopag, oprelvekin (a recombinant interleukin 11) and thrombopoietin. Several others are under clinical investigation such as lusutrombopag and avatrombopag.
