= Thrombopoietin mimetics =

Class of drugs

Thrombopoietin mimetics are drugs that considerably increase platelet production by stimulating the receptor for the hormone thrombopoietin; Romiplostim and Eltrombopag are examples. Thrombopoietin mimetics are a type of thrombopoietic agents. There has been a development of a registry of pregnant patients that were treated with these drugs.
