= Shionogi =

Japanese pharmaceutical company

Shionogi & Co., Ltd.
- Native name: 塩野義製薬株式会社
- Romanized name: Shionogi Seiyaku Kabushiki Kaisha
- Type: Public (K.K)
- Traded as: TYO: 4507; Nikkei 225 Component
- Industry: Biotechnology & Pharmaceuticals
- Founded: Osaka, Japan (March 17, 1878; 148 years ago)
- Founder: Gisaburo Shiono Sr.
- Headquarters: 1-8, Doshomachi 3-chome, Chuo-ku, Osaka 541-0045, Japan
- Key people: Isao Teshirogi, Ph.D. (CEO and President)
- Products: Diagnostics; Medical devices; Pharmaceuticals etc.
- Revenue: ▲¥ 426.684 billion (2022)
- Operating income: ▲¥ 133.274 billion (2022)
- Net income: ▲¥ 107.367 billion (2022)
- Total assets: ▲¥ 768.120 billion (2022)
- Total equity: ▲¥ 1,121.878 billion (2022)
- Number of employees: Consolidated : 6,082
- Subsidiaries: Shinogi Healthcare; Shinogi Pharma; UMN Pharma
- Website: Official website

Shionogi & Company, Limited (塩野義製薬株式会社, Shionogi Seiyaku Kabushiki Kaisha) is a Japanese pharmaceutical company best known for developing Crestor. Medical supply and brand name also uses katakana (シオノギ).

Shionogi has business roots that date back to 1878, and was incorporated in 1919. Among the medicines produced are for hyperlipidaemia, antibiotics, and cancer medicines.

In Japan it is particularly known as a producer of antimicrobial and antibiotics. Because of antibiotic resistance and slow growth of the antibiotic market, it has teamed up with US based Schering-Plough (merged in 2009 with Merck & Co) to become a sole marketing agent for its products in Japan.

Shionogi had supported the initial formation of Ranbaxy Pharmaceuticals, a generic manufacturer based in India. In 2012 the company became a partial owner of ViiV Healthcare, a pharmaceutical company specialising in the development of therapies for HIV.

The company is listed on the Tokyo Stock Exchange and Osaka Securities Exchange and is constituent of the Nikkei 225 stock index.

In June 2023, Shionogi announced its acquisition of Qpex Biopharma for approximately $140m.

On 5 October 2026, Shionogi announced an agreement to acquire IntraBio for US$2 billion through its US subsidiary, Shionogi Inc. The transaction would give Shionogi worldwide rights to Aqneursa (levacetylleucine). Completion was expected in November or December 2026, subject to regulatory approvals and other closing conditions.

== Medicines ==
=== Released ===
- Avelox, antibacterial antiseptic that treats a number of infections.
- Claritin, An anti-histamine marketed in alliance with Schering-Plough.
- Crestor, cholesterol drug
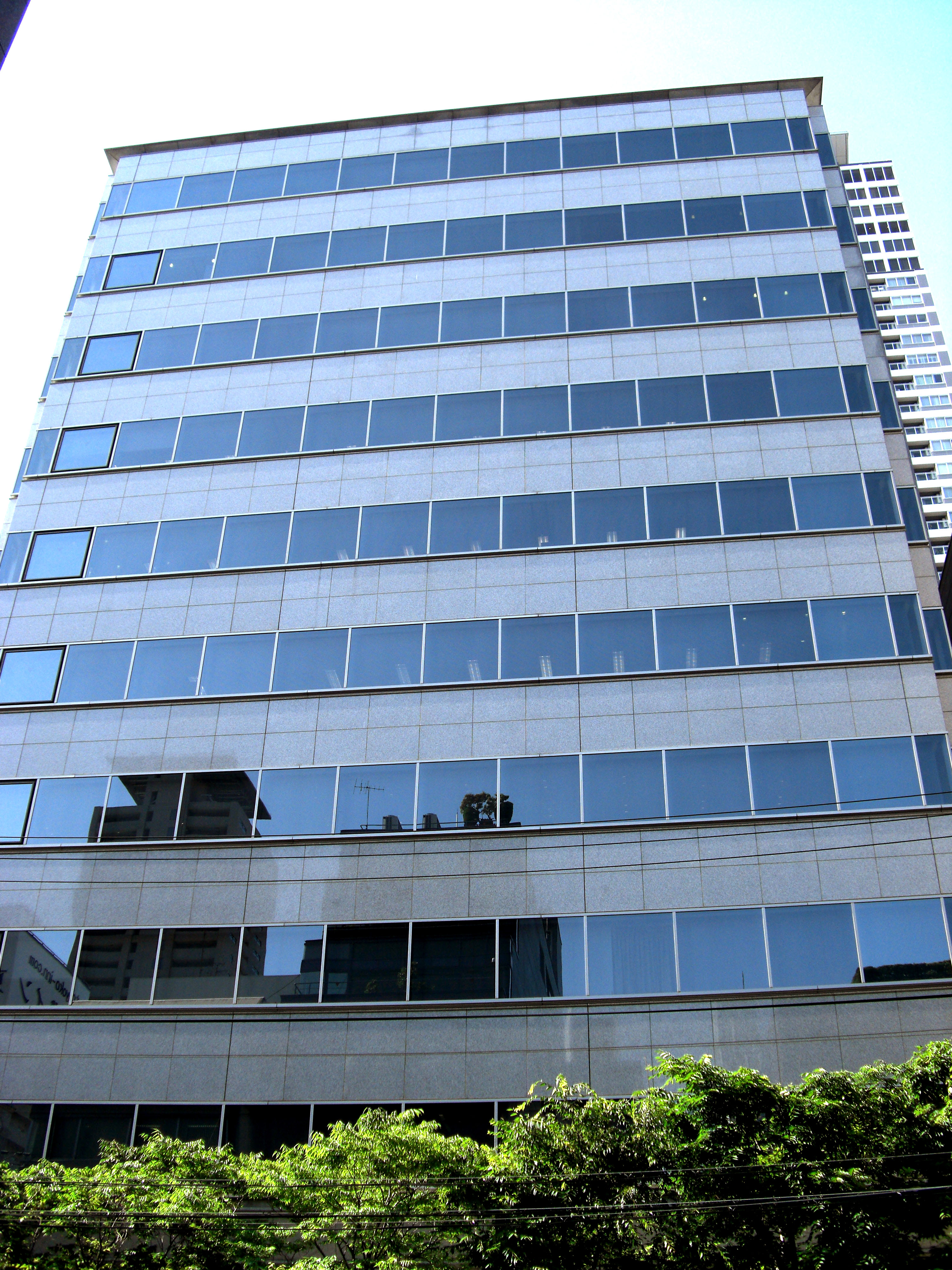
  Shionogi Headquarters in Osaka
  , marketing rights sold to AstraZeneca in 1998.
- Cymbalta, an SNRI class anti-depressant, marketed in alliance with Eli Lilly.
- Differin (developed by Galderma), a topical retinoid for acne, marketed in Japan in alliance with Galderma.
- Fortamet
- Methylin
- Mogadon, a short-term treatment for insomnia.
- Mulpleta, a thrombopoietin receptor agonist.
- Osphena, an estrogen receptor agonist, marketing rights sold to Duchesnay in 2017.
- Symproic, a μ-opioid receptor antagonist, for opioid-induced constipation treatment.
- Xofluza, an endonuclease inhibitor, for influenza treatment.
- Ensitrelvir, the first Japanese domestic pill to treat COVID-19.

=== Under development ===
- Asapiprant (BGE-175), a DP1 receptor antagonist under development for treatment of COVID-19 in elderly patients and allergic rhinitis.

== Media ==
- Shionogi (and later Shinonogi Healthcare) has been the sponsor of Fuji Television Network, Inc.'s "Music Fair" since it started in 1964. In January 2025, Shionogi has decided to remove its name from the show, due to the Fuji TV - Masahiro Nakai scandal. A Shionogi representative said in an interview, "I believe that Fuji Television should provide an explanation of the facts and future actions as soon as possible".
- Shionogi was a main sponsor of Team Lotus in the team's final years between 1991 and 1994.
- In June 2024, Cilcare and Shionogi announced an agreement where Shionogi had the rights to two drug candidates. Respectively, called CIL001 and CIL003 treatments for hearing loss.
