= IL-11 =

IL-11 or IL 11 can refer to:

- Interleukin 11
- Illinois's 11th congressional district
- Illinois Route 11
