= Marstacimab =

Medication

Monoclonal antibody
- Type: Whole antibody
- Source: Human
- Target: TFPI

Clinical data
- Pronunciation: /mɑːrˈstæsɪmæb/ mar-STAS-ih-mab
- Trade names: Hympavzi
- Other names: PF-06741086, marstacimab-hncq
- AHFS/Drugs.com: Monograph
- MedlinePlus: a624071
- License data: US DailyMed: Marstacimab
- Routes of administration: Subcutaneous
- Drug class: Tissue factor pathway inhibitor (TFPI)
- ATC code: B02BX11 (WHO)

Legal status
- Legal status: AU: S4 (Prescription only); US: ℞-only; EU: Rx-only

Identifiers
- CAS Number: 1985638-39-8
- IUPHAR/BPS: 13403
- DrugBank: DB17725
- UNII: 0UB3OA67O7
- KEGG: D11261
- ChEMBL: ChEMBL3990039

Chemical and physical data
- Formula: C_{6304}H_{9766}N_{1678}O_{2006}S_{44}
- Molar mass: 142569.85 g·mol^{−1}

Marstacimab, sold under the brand name Hympavzi, is a monoclonal antibody medication used for the treatment of hemophilia A and hemophilia B. It is a tissue factor pathway inhibitor antagonist. It was developed by Pfizer. Marstacimab is a new type of medication that, rather than replacing a clotting factor, works by reducing the amount, and therefore, the activity of, the naturally occurring anticoagulation protein called tissue factor pathway inhibitor. This increases the amount of thrombin, an enzyme that is critical in blood clotting, that is generated. This is expected to reduce or prevent the frequency of bleeding episodes.

The most common side effects include injection site reactions, headache, and itching (pruritis).

Marstacimab was approved for medical use in the United States in October 2024, and in the European Union in November 2024. The US Food and Drug Administration considers it to be a first-in-class medication.

== Medical uses ==
Marstacimab is indicated for routine prophylaxis to prevent or reduce the frequency of bleeding episodes in people aged twelve years of age and older with hemophilia A (congenital factor VIII deficiency) without factor VIII inhibitors, or hemophilia B (congenital factor IX deficiency) without factor IX inhibitors.

== Side effects ==
The US prescription label for marstacimab contains warnings and precautions about circulating blood clots (thromboembolic events), hypersensitivity, and embryofetal toxicity.

The most common side effects include injection site reactions, headache, and itching (pruritis).

== History ==
The US Food and Drug Administration (FDA) approval of marstacimab is based on the BASIS study (NCT03938792), an open-label, multi-center study in 116 adult and pediatric male participants with either severe hemophilia A or severe hemophilia B, both without inhibitors. For the first six months of this study, participants received treatment with replacement factor either on-demand (33 participants) or prophylactically (83 participants). These participants then received marstacimab prophylaxis for twelve months. The primary measure of efficacy of marstacimab was the annualized bleeding rates of treated bleeds. In the participants receiving on-demand factor replacement during the first six months of the study, the estimated annualized bleeding rate was 38 compared to the estimated annualized bleeding rate during treatment with marstacimab of 3.2, showing that marstacimab was superior to on-demand factor replacement. In the initial six-month period during which participants received prophylactic factor replacement, the estimated annualized bleeding rate was 7.85 and was 5.08 during the subsequent twelve months on marstacimab prophylaxis, showing that marstacimab provided similar bleeding rates. The FDA approved marstacimab based on evidence from a one clinical trial, BASIS (NCT03938792), which included 116 adults and pediatric participants twelve years of age and older with hemophilia A (congenital factor VIII deficiency) without factor VIII inhibitors and hemophilia B (congenital factor IX deficiency) without factor IX inhibitors. The trial was conducted at 52 sites in 19 countries in Bulgaria, Canada, China, Croatia, France, Hong Kong, India, Italy, Japan, Republic of Korea, Mexico, Oman, Russian Federation, Saudi Arabia, Serbia, South Africa, Spain, Turkey, and the United States. There was one participant from the United States and 115 participants from outside the United States enrolled in the trial.

The FDA granted the application for marstacimab orphan drug designation for this application. The FDA granted the approval of Hympavzi to Pfizer Inc.

== Society and culture ==
=== Legal status ===
In September 2024, the Committee for Medicinal Products for Human Use of the European Medicines Agency adopted a positive opinion, recommending the granting of a marketing authorization for the medicinal product Hympavzi, intended for prophylaxis of bleeding episodes in people aged twelve years of age and older, weighing at least 35 kilograms (77 lb), who have severe hemophilia A or B. The applicant for this medicinal product is Pfizer Europe Ma EEIG. Marstacimab was authorized for medical use in the European Union in November 2024.

The US Food and Drug Administration approved marstacimab in October 2024, for people aged twelve years of age and older with hemophilia A and B without inhibitors (to prevent or reduce bleeding episodes).

=== Names ===
Marstacimab is the international nonproprietary name.

Marstacimab is sold under the brand name Hympavzi.
