= Thrombopoietin =

Mammalian protein found in Homo sapiens

THPO
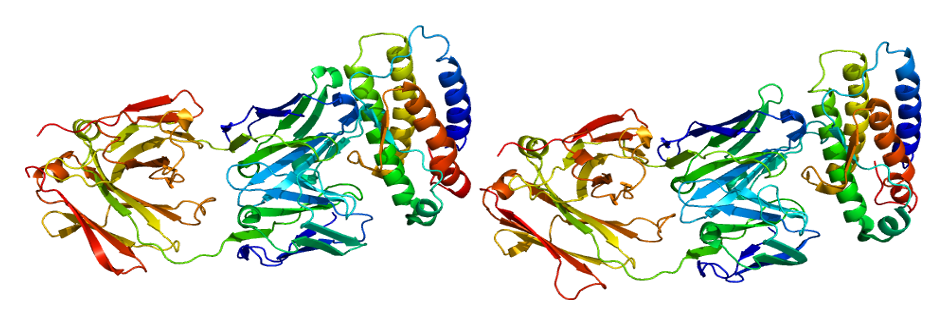
Available structures
PDB	Ortholog search: PDBe RCSB
PDB	List of PDB id codes 1V7M, 1V7N

Identifiers
- Aliases: THPO, MGDF, MKCSF, ML, MPLLG, THCYT1, TPO, thrombopoietin
- External IDs: OMIM: 600044; MGI: 101875; HomoloGene: 398; GeneCards: THPO; OMA:THPO - orthologs

Gene location (Human)
Chr.	Chromosome 3 (human)
Band	3q27.1	Start	184,371,935 bp
Band	3q27.1	End	184,381,968 bp

Gene location (Mouse)
Chr.	Chromosome 16 (mouse)
Band	16 B1|16 12.51 cM	Start	20,543,204 bp
Band	16 B1|16 12.51 cM	End	20,553,261 bp
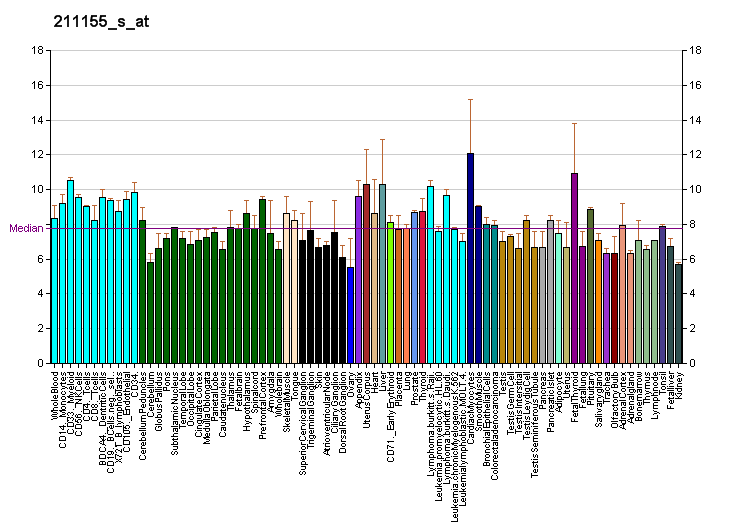

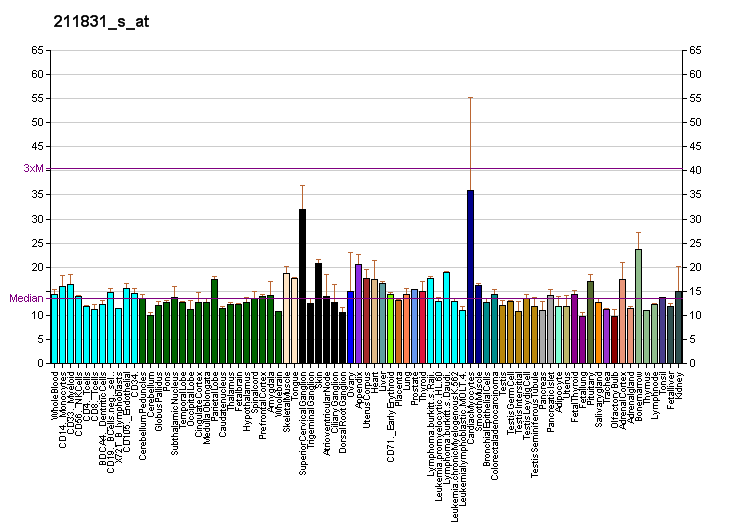

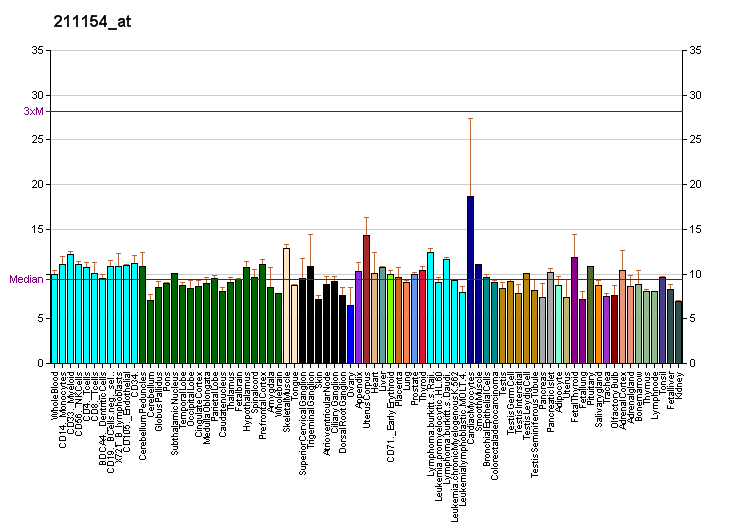
RNA expression pattern
Bgee	Human / Mouse (ortholog); Top expressed in: right lobe of liver; right hemisphere of cerebellum; right frontal lobe; body of uterus; cingulate gyrus; anterior cingulate cortex; Brodmann area 9; right adrenal gland; canal of the cervix; right ovary / Top expressed in: muscle of thigh; right kidney; yolk sac; primary visual cortex; proximal tubule; embryo; embryo; tail of embryo; superior frontal gyrus; left lobe of liver; More reference expression data
BioGPS	More reference expression data
Gene ontology
Molecular function	cytokine activity; growth factor activity; hormone activity; signaling receptor binding
Cellular component	extracellular region; extracellular space
Biological process	multicellular organism development; positive regulation of hematopoietic stem cell proliferation; cell population proliferation; regulation of signaling receptor activity; positive regulation of protein phosphorylation; thrombopoietin-mediated signaling pathway; positive regulation of megakaryocyte differentiation; positive regulation of protein kinase B signaling; positive regulation of ERK1 and ERK2 cascade; positive regulation of cell population proliferation; myeloid cell differentiation; megakaryocyte development; positive regulation of MAPK cascade; receptor signaling pathway via STAT
Sources:Amigo / QuickGO
Orthologs
Species	Human	Mouse
Entrez	7066	21832
Ensembl	ENSG00000090534	ENSMUSG00000022847
UniProt	P40225	P40226
RefSeq (mRNA)	NM_000460; NM_001177597; NM_001177598; NM_001289997; NM_001289998 NM_001290003; NM_001290022; NM_001290026; NM_001290027; NM_001290028; NM_199228; NM_199356	NM_001173505; NM_009379; NM_001289894; NM_001289896
RefSeq (protein)	NP_000451; NP_001171068; NP_001171069; NP_001276926; NP_001276927 NP_001276932; NP_001276951; NP_001276955; NP_001276956; NP_001276957	NP_001166976; NP_001276823; NP_001276825; NP_033405
Location (UCSC)	Chr 3: 184.37 – 184.38 Mb	Chr 16: 20.54 – 20.55 Mb
PubMed search
- Wikidata
View/Edit Human	View/Edit Mouse

Thrombopoietin (THPO) also known as megakaryocyte growth and development factor (MGDF) is a protein that in humans is encoded by the THPO gene.

Thrombopoietin is a glycoprotein hormone produced by the liver and kidney which regulates the production of platelets. It stimulates the production and differentiation of megakaryocytes, the bone marrow cells that bud off large numbers of platelets.

Megakaryocytopoiesis is the cellular development process that leads to platelet production. The protein encoded by this gene is a humoral growth factor necessary for megakaryocyte proliferation and maturation, as well as for thrombopoiesis. This protein is the ligand for MLP/C_MPL, the product of myeloproliferative leukemia virus oncogene.

== Genetics ==
The thrombopoietin gene is located on the long arm of chromosome 3 (q26.3-27). Abnormalities in this gene occur in some hereditary forms of thrombocytosis (high platelet count) and in some cases of leukemia. The first 155 amino acids of the protein share homology with erythropoietin.

== Function and regulation ==
Thrombopoietin is produced in the liver by both parenchymal cells and sinusoidal endothelial cells, as well as in the kidney by proximal convoluted tubule cells. Small amounts are also made by striated muscle and bone marrow stromal cells. In the liver, its production is augmented by interleukin 6 (IL-6). However, the liver and the kidney are the primary sites of thrombopoietin production.

Thrombopoietin regulates the differentiation of megakaryocytes and platelets, but studies on the removal of the thrombopoietin receptor show that its effects on hematopoiesis are more versatile.

Its negative feedback is different from that of most hormones in endocrinology: The effector regulates the hormone directly. Thrombopoietin is bound to the surface of platelets and megakaryocytes by the mpl receptor (CD 110). Inside the platelets it gets destroyed, while inside the megakaryocytes it gives the signal of their maturation and consecutively more platelet production. The bounding of the hormone at these cells thereby reduces further megakaryocyte exposure to the hormone. Therefore, the rising and dropping platelet and megakaryocyte concentrations regulate the thrombopoietin levels. Low platelets and megakaryocytes lead a higher degree of thrombopoietin exposure to the undifferentiated bone marrow cells, leading to differentiation into megakaryocytes and further maturation of these cells. On the other hand, high platelet and megakaryocyte concentrations lead to more thrombopoetin destruction and thus less availability of thrombopoietin to bone marrow.

TPO, like EPO, plays a role in brain development. It promotes apoptosis of newly generated neurons, an effect counteracted by EPO and neurotrophins.

== Therapeutic use ==
Despite numerous trials, thrombopoietin has not been found to be useful therapeutically. Theoretical uses include the procurement of platelets for donation, and recovery of platelet counts after myelosuppressive chemotherapy.

Trials of a modified recombinant form, megakaryocyte growth and differentiation factor (MGDF), were stopped when healthy volunteers developed autoantibodies to endogenous thrombopoietin and then developed thrombocytopenia. Romiplostim and Eltrombopag, compounds that are structurally different to thrombopoietin but stimulate the same pathway by binding to and activating the thrombopoietin receptor, are used instead.

A quadrivalent peptide analogue is being investigated, as well as several small-molecule agents, and several non-peptide ligands of c-Mpl, which act as thrombopoietin analogues.

== Discovery ==
Thrombopoietin was cloned by five independent teams in 1994. Before its identification, its function has been hypothesized for as much as 30 years as being linked to the cell surface receptor c-Mpl, and in older publications thrombopoietin is described as c-Mpl ligand (the agent that binds to the c-Mpl molecule). Thrombopoietin is one of the Class I hematopoietic cytokines.

== See also ==
- Thrombopoietic agent
