= Tetragalacturonic acid hydroxymethylester =

Chemical compound

Clinical data
- ATC code: B02BC03 (WHO)

Identifiers
- IUPAC name: Hydroxymethyl 6-(hydroxymethyl)-α-D-galactopyranuronosyl-(1→4)-6-(hydroxymethyl)-α-D-galactopyranuronosyl-(1→4)-6-(hydroxymethyl)-α-D-galactopyranuronosyl-(1→4)-α-D-galactopyranuronate
- CAS Number: 53008-15-4
- PubChem CID: 72941563
- ChemSpider: 32698706
- UNII: 94C20R1E96
- ChEBI: CHEBI:136025

Chemical and physical data
- Formula: C_{28}H_{42}O_{29}
- Molar mass: 842.615 g·mol^{−1}
- 3D model (JSmol): Interactive image
- SMILES: C(O)OC(=O)[C@@H]1[C@@H]([C@@H]([C@H]([C@H](O1)O[C@@H]2[C@@H]([C@H]([C@H](O[C@@H]2C(=O)OCO)O[C@@H]3[C@@H]([C@H]([C@H](O[C@@H]3C(=O)OCO)O[C@@H]4[C@@H]([C@H]([C@H](O[C@@H]4C(=O)OCO)O)O)O)O)O)O)O)O)O)O
- InChI: InChI=1S/C28H42O29/c29-1-47-22(43)17-6(34)5(33)11(39)26(55-17)53-15-8(36)13(41)28(57-19(15)24(45)49-3-31)54-16-9(37)12(40)27(56-20(16)25(46)50-4-32)52-14-7(35)10(38)21(42)51-18(14)23(44)48-2-30/h5-21,26-42H,1-4H2/t5-,6+,7+,8+,9+,10+,11+,12+,13+,14+,15+,16+,17-,18-,19-,20-,21-,26-,27-,28-/m0/s1; Key:PGQMFCVZFGJVNB-LRVJTQDXSA-N

Tetragalacturonic acid hydroxymethylester is a local antihemorrhagic. It is derived from apple pectin. It is not used clinically, but research in the 1970s suggests that pectin and analogues may inhibit fibrinolysis in vitro.
