= TMPRSS2 =

Protein-coding gene in humans

Identifiers
- Aliases: TMPRSS2, PP9284, PRSS10, transmembrane protease, serine 2, transmembrane serine protease 2
- External IDs: OMIM: 602060; MGI: 1354381; GeneCards: TMPRSS2
Enzyme activity
EC #	BRENDA	ExPASy	KEGG	MetaCyc
3.4.21.122	↗	↗	↗	↗

Gene location (Human)
Chr.	Chromosome 21 (human)
Band	21q22.3	Start	41,464,300 bp
Band	21q22.3	End	41,531,116 bp

Gene location (Mouse)
Chr.	Chromosome 16 (mouse)
Band	16 C4|16 57.53 cM	Start	97,365,882 bp
Band	16 C4|16 57.53 cM	End	97,412,395 bp
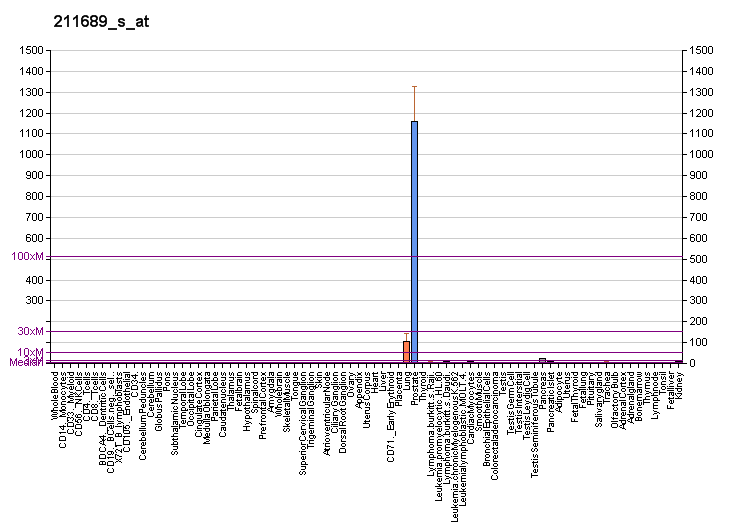

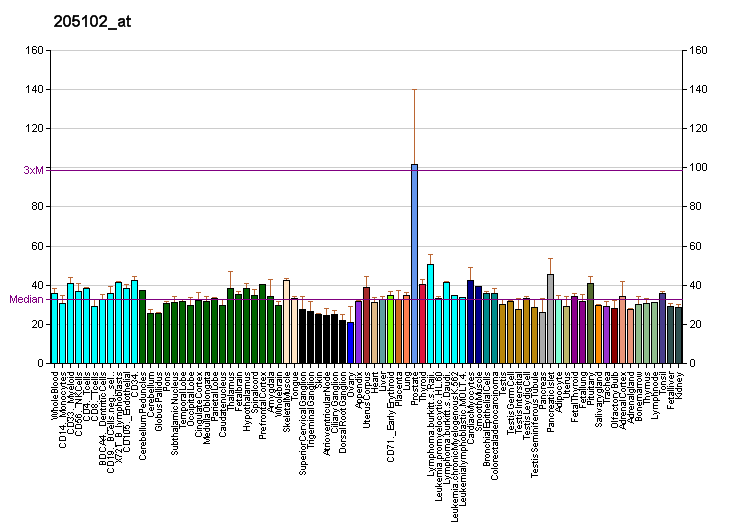
RNA expression pattern
Bgee	Human / Mouse (ortholog); Top expressed in: mucosa of transverse colon; mucosa of sigmoid colon; body of pancreas; rectum; prostate; parotid gland; duodenum; mucosa of ileum; olfactory zone of nasal mucosa; pylorus / Top expressed in: Paneth cell; transitional epithelium of urinary bladder; left colon; crypt of lieberkuhn of small intestine; epithelium of stomach; yolk sac; mucous cell of stomach; medullary collecting duct; pyloric antrum; duodenum; More reference expression data
BioGPS	More reference expression data
Gene ontology
Molecular function	scavenger receptor activity; peptidase activity; serine-type peptidase activity; protein binding; hydrolase activity; serine-type endopeptidase activity
Cellular component	integral component of membrane; extracellular region; plasma membrane; integral component of plasma membrane; extracellular exosome; membrane
Biological process	positive regulation of viral entry into host cell; protein autoprocessing; receptor-mediated endocytosis; proteolysis; vesicle-mediated transport; endocytosis
Sources:Amigo / QuickGO
Orthologs
Databases	NCBI: entry; OMA: entry
Species	Human	Mouse
Entrez	7113	50528
Ensembl	ENSG00000184012	ENSMUSG00000000385
UniProt	O15393	Q9JIQ8
RefSeq (mRNA)	NM_001135099; NM_005656; NM_001382720	NM_015775
RefSeq (protein)	NP_001128571; NP_005647; NP_001369649	NP_056590
Location (UCSC)	Chr 21: 41.46 – 41.53 Mb	Chr 16: 97.37 – 97.41 Mb
PubMed search
- Wikidata
View/Edit Human	View/Edit Mouse

Transmembrane protease, serine 2 is an enzyme that in humans is encoded by the TMPRSS2 gene. It belongs to the TMPRSS family of proteins, whose members are transmembrane proteins which have a serine protease activity. The TMPRSS2 protein is found in high concentration in the cell membranes of epithelial cells of the lung and of the prostate, but also in the heart, liver and gastrointestinal tract.

Mutations of the TMPRSS2 gene are often involved in prostate cancer. Several viruses, including SARS-CoV-2, use the protease activity of the TMPRSS2 protein in the process of entering cells.

== Function ==
The TMPRSS2 gene encodes a protein that belongs to the serine protease family. The encoded protein contains a type II transmembrane domain, a low density lipoprotein receptor class A domain, a scavenger receptor cysteine-rich domain and a protease domain. Serine proteases are known to be involved in many physiological and pathological processes. This gene is up-regulated by androgenic hormones in prostate cancer cells and down-regulated in androgen-independent prostate cancer tissue. The protease domain of this protein is thought to be cleaved and secreted into cell media after autocleavage. TMPRSS2 participates in proteolytic cascades necessary for normal physiological function of the prostate. Gene knockout mice lacking TMPRSS2 show no abnormalities.

== Structure ==
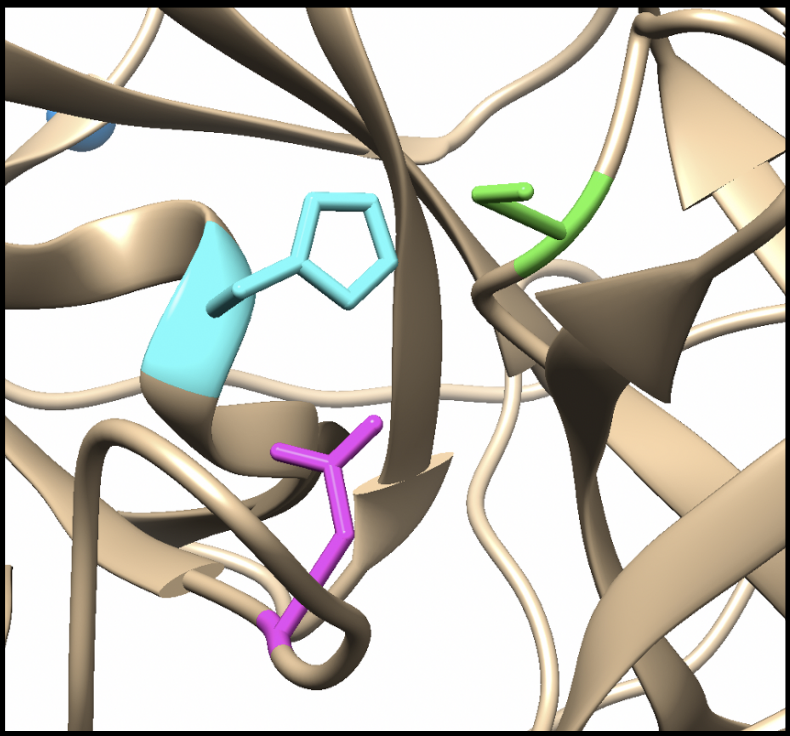
His296, Asp345, and Ser441 catalytic triad within the Serine Peptidase domain on TMPRSS2 that is characteristic of almost all Type II Serine proteases. The serine (green) engages in nucleophilic attack, the histidine (cyan) acts as a general base to reset the serine and the aspartate (magenta) neutralizes the histidine in transition states during reactions that cause proteolytic cleavage. This structure was solved via X-ray crystallography with a resolution of 1.95 Angstroms (PDB: 7MEQ). Image made in Chimera.

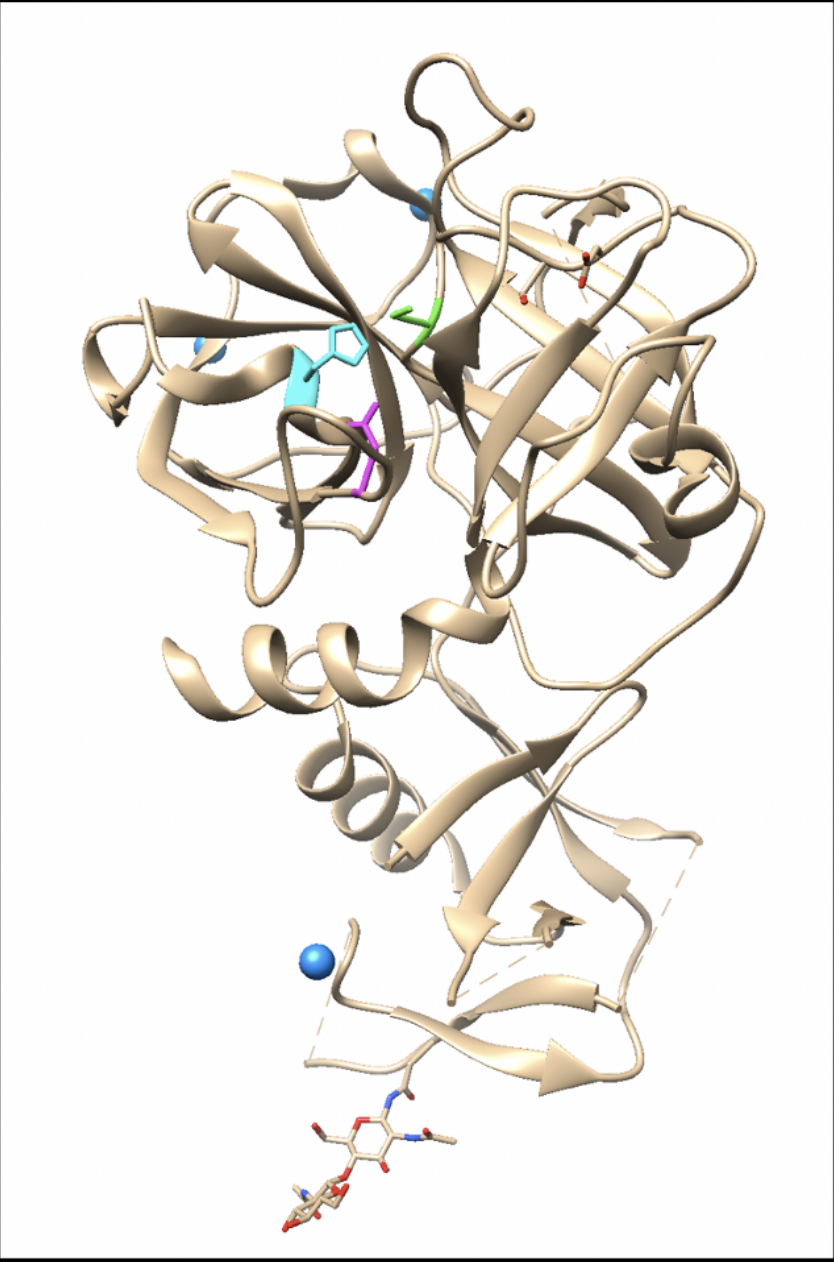
Solved structure of TMPRSS2 is shown here (PDB: 7MEQ), the entire protein is oriented with the extracellular side towards the top and the cytoplasmic side towards the bottom. Bound calcium ions are shown in blue and function as stabilizing cofactors. This view (generated in Chimera) illustrates the largely open conformation that exposes the catalytic triad.

As a type II transmembrane protease, TMPRSS2 consists of an intracellular N-terminal domain, a transmembrane domain, a stem region that extends extracellularly and a C-terminal domain that catalyzes its serine protease (SP) activity. This serine protease activity is orchestrated by a catalytic triad containing the residues His296, Asp345, and Ser441. This noted catalytic triad is typically responsible for the cleaving of basic amino acid residues (lysine or arginine residues)— consistent with what is observed in the S1/S2 cleavage site found in SARS-CoV-2. A notable domain in the stem region that has been examined through mutational analysis is the low density lipoprotein receptor class A domain (LDLRA). Experimental evidence suggests that this domain likely participates in enzymatic activity of the protein and has been examined alongside another motif in the stem region: the scavenger receptor cysteine-rich domain (SRCR). This domain may be implicated in the binding of extracellular molecules and other nearby cells. Interestingly, SRCR may have a role in overall proteolytic activity of the protein, which could lead to implications on the overall virulence of SARS-CoV-2.

== Clinical significance ==
=== In prostate cancer ===
TMPRSS2 protein's function in prostate carcinogenesis relies on overexpression of ETS transcription factors, such as ERG and ETV1, through gene fusion. TMPRSS2-ERG fusion gene is the most frequent, present in 40% - 80% of prostate cancers in humans. ERG overexpression contributes to development of androgen-independence in prostate cancer through disruption of androgen receptor signaling.

=== Coronaviruses ===
Some coronaviruses, e.g. SARS-CoV-1, MERS-CoV, and SARS-CoV-2 (although less well by the omicron variant), are activated by TMPRSS2 and can thus be inhibited by TMPRSS2 inhibitors. SARS-CoV-2 uses the SARS-CoV receptor ACE2 for entry and the serine protease TMPRSS2 for S protein priming.

Cleavage of the SARS-CoV-2 S2 spike protein required for viral entry into cells can be accomplished by proteases TMPRSS2 located on the cell membrane, or by cathepsins (primarily cathepsin L) in endolysosomes. Hydroxychloroquine inhibits the action of cathepsin L in endolysosomes, but because cathepsin L cleavage is minor compared to TMPRSS2 cleavage, hydroxychloroquine does little to inhibit SARS-CoV-2 infection.

The enzyme Adam17 has similar ACE2 cleavage activity as TMPRSS2, but by forming soluble ACE2, Adam17 may actually have the protective effect of blocking circulating SARS‑CoV‑2 virus particles. By not releasing soluble ACE2, TMPRSS2 cleavage is more harmful.

A TMPRSS2 inhibitor such as camostat approved for clinical use blocked entry and might constitute a treatment option. Another experimental candidate as a TMPRSS2 inhibitor for potential use against both influenza and coronavirus infections in general, including those prior to the advent of COVID-19, is the over-the-counter (in most countries) mucolytic cough medicine bromhexine, which is also being investigated as a possible treatment for COVID-19 itself as well. The fact that TMPRSS2 has no known irreplaceable function makes it a promising target for preventing SARS-CoV-2 virus transmission.

The fact that severe illness and death from Sars-Cov-2 is more common in males than females, and that TMPRSS2 is expressed several times more highly in prostate epithelium than any tissue, suggests a role for TMPRSS2 in the gender difference. Prostate cancer patients receiving androgen deprivation therapy have a lower risk of SARS-CoV-2 infection than those not receiving that therapy.

== Inhibitors ==
Camostat is an inhibitor of the serine protease activity of TMPRSS2. It is used to treat pancreatitis and reflux esophagitis. It was found not to be effective against COVID-19. A novel inhibitor of TMPRSS2 (N-0385) has been found to be effective against SARS-CoV-2 infection in cell and animal models.
