= Ulinastatin =

Human glycoprotein

Clinical data
- Trade names: Miraclid
- AHFS/Drugs.com: International Drug Names
- Routes of administration: Intravenous infusion
- ATC code: B02AB05 (WHO)

Identifiers
- CAS Number: 80449-31-6
- DrugBank: DB12038
- UNII: OR3S9IF86U
- KEGG: D05183

Ulinastatin is a glycoprotein that is isolated from healthy human urine or synthetically produced and has molecular weight of 25 - 40kDa. It acts as a urinary trypsin inhibitor (UTI). Highly purified ulinastatin has been clinically used for the treatment of acute pancreatitis, chronic pancreatitis, Stevens–Johnson syndrome, burns, septic shock, and toxic epidermal necrolysis (TEN).

The drug is used in Japan, where its brand name is Miraclid, as well as in South Korea, China, and India. In India, where it is approved to treat severe sepsis and acute pancreatitis, In India it is marketed under the brand name U-Tryp (BSV), Pranastin (Pranada Biopharma) and so many other brands are also available. It is also known by the names Bikunin and Urinastatin. In China, where it is approved to treat acute pancreatitis, chronic recurrent pancreatitis and acute circulatory failure, it is marketed under the brand name Techpool Roan.

== Effectiveness ==
Ulinastatin is available in countries like China, Japan and India for the management of sepsis and acute pancreatitis.

In Japan, It is clinically used to treat endoscopic retrograde cholangiopancreatography (ERCP)-induced pancreatitis. Studies in Japan have documented a reduction in the incidence of ERCP-induced pancreatitis with the use of ulinastatin. In one study, the incidence of hyperenzymemia and pancreatitis was significantly lower in the ulinastatin group than in the placebo group. In another study, ulinastatin reduced serum, drain amylase, and the incidence of postoperative pancreatitis following pancreaticoduodenectomy.

A study conducted in India found that mortality from all causes over 22 days in subjects with severe pancreatitis was lower among those receiving ulinastatin than those receiving placebo (2.8% versus 18.8%; p=0.048), resulting in a 16% absolute reduction in the risk of death and a relative reduction of 85%. The results indicated that in this population, one life would be saved for every 6.25 subjects treated with ulinastatin. New organ dysfunction was seen in 12 subjects with severe pancreatitis on ulinastatin and 29 on placebo (p=0.0026).

== Mechanism of action ==
Ulinastatin is an acid-resistant protease inhibitor found in human urine and released from the high-molecular-weight precursor I alpha T1. It inactivates many serine proteases, including trypsin, chymotrypsin, kallikrein, plasmin, granulocyte elastase, cathepsin, thrombin, and factors IXa, Xa, XIa, and XlIa. However, although ulinastatin is a protease inhibitor, its activity toward various proteases is relatively weak.

Ulinastatin protein has been found in the brain, liver, kidney, gastrointestinal tract, cartilage, plasma, ovarian follicular fluid, amniotic fluid, and urine. Its mRNA has been detected only in the liver, kidney, heart, lungs, and pancreas. The presence of ulinastatin in certain tissues appears to be due to diffusional uptake and retention through cell surfaces. Ulinastatin also potentiates local anti-proteolytic activity on the extracellular matrix (ECM) during tissue remodeling, possibly through noncovalent binding to TSG-6.

Its secretion is upregulated by pro-inflammatory cytokines, including IL-6, IL-1beta, and TNF-alpha. These cytokines also enhance the synthesis of intracellular I alpha T1 proteins and IL-1beta upregulated ulinastatin. Ulinastatin is implicated in downregulating or suppressing the production of proMMP-1 and proMMP, prostaglandin H2 synthase-2, urokinase, CXC chemokine, pro-inflammatory cytokines, inducible nitric oxide synthase, tissue factor, P-selectin, intercellular adhesion molecule-1, phosphorylation of the extracellular signal-regulated protein kinases, and NF-kappaB activation.

Ulinastatin also suppresses neutrophil accumulation and activity. The genes and proteins regulated by ulinastatin are implicated in the inflammatory process. Therefore, ulinastatin is not just a protease inhibitor, but can also prevent inflammation and cytokine-dependent signaling pathways. In preclinical and clinical studies, ulinastatin protected against acute lung injury, graft ischemia/reperfusion injury, renal failure after cardiopulmonary bypass, severe burn injury, septic shock, preterm birth, tumor invasion, and metastasis. Its anti-metastatic properties may come from the inhibition of cell-bound plasmin activity. Ulinastatin also prevents tumor progression, partially by inhibiting cathepsin B activity. In particular, ulinastatin is thought to inhibit CD44 dimerization and suppress the MAP kinase signaling cascade, thus preventing ECM degradation, tumor cell invasion, and angiogenesis.

Altogether, ulinastatin plays an important role not only in the protection of organ injury during severe inflammation, but also in the inhibition of tumor invasion and metastasis.

== Dosage and administration ==
Patients are typically given one or two 100,000 I.U. vials of ulinastatin (reconstituted in 100 ml of dextrose 5% or 100 ml of 0.9% normal saline) by intravenous infusion over the course of one hour, one to three times per day for three to five days. The dosage may be adjusted according to patients' age and the severity of symptoms.
