= Oprelvekin =

Pharmaceutical drug

Clinical data
- AHFS/Drugs.com: Monograph
- Routes of administration: subcutaneous (s.c.) injection
- ATC code: L03AC02 (WHO)

Legal status
- Legal status: In general: ℞ (Prescription only)

Pharmacokinetic data
- Bioavailability: >80% (s.c.)
- Metabolism: mainly renal
- Elimination half-life: 6.9 ± 1.7 hours

Identifiers
- CAS Number: 145941-26-0
- IUPHAR/BPS: 6971
- DrugBank: DB00038
- ChemSpider: none
- UNII: HM5641GA6F
- ChEMBL: ChEMBL1201573

Chemical and physical data
- Formula: C_{854}H_{1411}N_{253}O_{235}S_{2}
- Molar mass: 19047.34 g·mol^{−1}

Oprelvekin is recombinant interleukin eleven (IL-11), a thrombopoietic growth factor that directly stimulates the proliferation of hematopoietic stem cells and megakaryocyte progenitor cells and induces megakaryocyte maturation resulting in increased platelet production. It is marketed under the trade name Neumega.

== Chemical, pharmacological and marketing data ==
IL-11 is a member of a family of human growth factors and is being produced in the bone marrow of healthy adults. Synonyms are:

- AGIF
- Adipogenesis inhibitory factor
- Interleukin-11 precursor.

Oprelvekin is produced in Escherichia coli (E. coli) by recombinant DNA technology. The protein has a molecular mass of approximately 19,000 g/mol, and is non-glycosylated. The polypeptide is 177 amino acids in length (the natural IL-11 has 178). This alteration has not resulted in measurable differences in bioactivity either in vitro or in vivo.

The primary hematopoietic activity of Neumega is stimulation of megakaryocytopoiesis and thrombopoiesis. In mice and nonhuman primate studies Neumega has shown potent thrombopoietic activity in compromised hematopoiesis, including moderately to severely myelosuppressed animals. In these studies, Neumega improved platelet nadirs and accelerated platelet recoveries compared to controls.

In animal studies oprelvekin also has non-hematopoietic activities. This includes the regulation of intestinal epithelium growth (enhanced healing of gastrointestinal lesions), the inhibition of adipogenesis, the induction of acute phase protein synthesis (e.g., fibrinogen), and inhibition of macrophageal released pro-inflammatory cytokines. However, pathologic changes, some also seen in humans, have been noticed:

- papilledema
- fibrosis of tendons and joint capsules
- periosteal thickening and
- embryotoxicity (see under pregnancy).

In preclinical human trials mature megakaryocytes which develop during in vivo treatment with Neumega were ultrastructurally, morphologically, and functionally normal. They also showed a normal life span.

In a study in which a single 50 μg/kg subcutaneous dose was administered to eighteen healthy men, the peak serum concentration (C_{max}) of 17.4 ± 5.4 ng/mL was reached at 3.2 ± 2.4 h (T_{max}) following dosing. The terminal half-life was 6.9 ± 1.7 hours. In a second study in which single 75 μg/kg subcutaneous and intravenous doses were administered to twenty-four healthy subjects, the pharmacokinetic profiles were similar between men and women. The absolute bioavailability of Neumega was >80%. In a study in which multiple, subcutaneous doses of both 25 and 50 μg/kg were administered to cancer patients receiving chemotherapy, Neumega did not accumulate and clearance of Neumega was not altered following multiple doses. Pediatric cancer patients treated with aggressive chemotherapy showed similar pharmakinetic characteristics.

In humans treated with oprelvekin on a daily base a twofold increase in fibrinogen levels occurred. Healthy volunteers displayed an increase in von-Willebrand-factor (vWf) activity. Isolated molecules formed under oprelvekin were found to have exact the same multimere structure as the 'normal' factor and were therefore fully functioning. These increases in coagulation factors may contribute to the development of stroke (see under § Side effects), but a precise association cannot be made at this stage.

In a variety of clinical studies upon which FDA approval is based, Neumega showed effectivity in reducing thrombocytopenia in oncologic patients treated with myelosuppressant chemotherapeutic drugs as measured by significantly decreased need of platelet transfusions.

Neumega is manufactured and sold by Wyeth. The drug is formulated in single-use vials containing 5 mg of oprelvekin (specific activity approximately 8 million units/mg) as a sterile, lyophilized powder. The FDA approved the drug in 1997.

== Indications ==
Neumega is indicated for the prevention of severe thrombocytopenia and the reduction of the need for platelet transfusions following myelosuppressive chemotherapy in adult patients with nonmyeloid malignancies who are at high risk of severe thrombocytopenia. Efficacy was demonstrated in patients who had experienced severe thrombocytopenia following the previous chemotherapy cycle.

== Contraindications and precautions ==
- Patients with known hypersensitivity to Oprelvekin itself or any other ingredient.
- Patients with severe or decompensated heart failure should not be treated, because Oprelvekin may cause excessive fluid retention with edema and cardiac decompensation. Patients with compensated heart disease should be treated with caution and under permanent clinical supervision.
- Neumega is not indicated following myeloablative chemotherapy (increased likelihood of severe side-effects) and in pediatric patients.
- Renal impairment: Neumega is excreted renally. No differences of pharmakinetic parameters and clinical differences have been seen in mild to moderate impairment. Severe impairment has led to an increased number of patients with reduced hemoglobin due to dilutional anemia. Patients with severely disturbed renal function should be monitored very closely.
- The efficacy of Oprelvekin has not been systematically studied in patients receiving chemotherapy regimes of more than 5 days duration/each cycle or in those regimes containing agents that induce delayed thrombocytopenia (e.g. nitrosoureas, mitomycin C. Neumega should not be given in these cases.

== Pregnancy ==
In studies with rats and rabbits treated chronically, Oprelvekin showed embryo- and fetotoxicity (early death of embryos and reduction of number of fetus, fetal malformations etc.). There is no sufficient human data available. Pregnant women should only be treated, if the benefit to the mother outweighs the potential risk to the unborn.

== Lactation ==
No human data is available if the drug is distributed into human milk. Nursing women should either discontinue breast-feeding or Neumega, the decision should take into account the importance of the drug to the mother.

== Side effects ==
Neumega has caused allergic reaction which at times have been very serious. Symptoms have been edema of the face and tongue, or larynx; shortness of breath; wheezing; chest pain; hypotension (including shock); dysarthria; loss of consciousness, rash, urticaria, flushing, and fever. These reaction can occur after the first dose or after any later application. Neumega should be permanently discontinued in patients with any sign of allergy. Treatment is largely symptomatic.

Oprelvekin also has caused quite often fluid retention, ranging from peripheral edema (approximately 40% of patients) to dyspnea and full developed lung edema with or without cardiac decompensation (see contraindications and precautions). These symptoms have led to some deaths. Fluid retention may also lead to dilutional anemia (in 10 to 15% of patients). Hypokalemia may also result. Symptoms of fluid retention have been observed more often in patients following myeloablative chemotherapy (see contraindications). Severe arrhythmias (atrial flutter and atrial fibrillation) as well as fatal cardiac arrest have also been seen which may or may be not attributed to fluid retention/increased volume. Isolated cases of stroke have been noted, those patients with previous transient ischemic attacks or partial/minor strokes may be at particular risk.

Papilledema of the eyes has been observed (2%) and may lead to disturbed visual acuity and even temporary or permanent blindness. Patients with preexisting papilledema or with involvement of the central nervous system may be at higher risk.

In postmarketing studies isolated cases of severe ventricular arrhythmias and renal failure have been seen.

Injection site reactions like have also been observed (dermatitis, pain, and discoloration), but are usually mild.

== Interactions ==
The concomitant application of GM-CSFs such as filgrastim or Sargramostim showed no potential interactions. Additionally, no other interactions are known. Interactions with drugs undergoing P450 enzyme metabolism are not likely to occur.

== Necessary examinations during treatment ==
Complete blood counts should be obtained before starting chemotherapy and in short intervals afterwards. Platelet counts should be done at the time of expected nadir (lowest number of platelets) and at least until remission starts (platelet counts greater than 50,000). The patients should be watched for signs of allergy, fluid retention and anemia during and after therapy with Neumega. Preexisting ascites and pericardial effusions should be monitored closely for signs of worsening.

== Dosage regimen ==
The dosage in patients without severe renal impairment is 50 μg/kg subcutaneously once a day either abdominal, in thigh, or hip. Most patients will be able to self-administer the drug after appropriate training.

Patients with severe renal impairment should receive only 25 μg/kg daily.

The first dose should be given 6 to 24 hours after completion of chemotherapy. Dosing should be continued until platelet counts reach at least 50,000 cells. Usually, one course of Neumega encompasses 10 to 21 days.

The drug should be discontinued at least 2 days before starting the next chemotherapy cycle.

== Additional information ==
Neumega vials must be stored in a refrigerator at 2–8 °C (36–46 °F). Protect from light. Do not freeze.
