= Susoctocog alfa =

Medication

Clinical data
- Trade names: Obizur
- Other names: Antihemophilic factor (recombinant)
- AHFS/Drugs.com: Monograph
- License data: US DailyMed: Obizur
- Pregnancy category: AU: B2
- Drug class: Antihemophilic factor
- ATC code: B02BD14 (WHO)

Legal status
- Legal status: AU: S4 (Prescription only); CA: ℞-only; UK: POM (Prescription only); US: ℞-only; EU: Rx-only; In general: ℞ (Prescription only)

Identifiers
- CAS Number: 1339940-90-7
- DrugBank: DB11606
- UNII: 6892UQT2GK
- KEGG: D10831

Susoctocog alfa, sold under the brand name Obizur, is a medication used for the treatment of bleeding episodes in adults with acquired haemophilia, a bleeding disorder caused by the spontaneous development of antibodies that inactivate factor VIII.

Susoctocog alfa was approved for medical use in the United States in October 2014, and for medical use in the European Union in November 2015.

Factor VIII is one of the proteins needed for normal clotting of the blood.
