= Cilcare =

French biotechnology company

- Type: Private
- Industry: Biotechnology
- Founded: 6 June 2014
- Founder: Celia Belline Marie-Pierre Pasdelou Sylvie Pucheu
- Headquarters: Montpellier, France
- Key people: Celia Belline (CEO)
- Website: https://www.cilcare.com

Cilcare is a French biotechnology company founded in 2014, specialized in the development of therapies for auditory pathologies. Headquartered in Montpellier, France, with operations in Boston, the company focuses on addressing underdiagnosed hearing disorders such as cochlear synaptopathy and tinnitus.'

== Activities ==
Cilcare conducts research on hearing disorders, including cochlear synaptopathy and tinnitus, using technologies like AI and biotech. The company is developing treatments, such as CIL001, to restore neural connections and identify auditory biomarkers. Its research aims to improve the diagnosis and treatment of hearing-related conditions.'

== History ==
Cilcare was founded in 2014 by three former Sanofi executives: Célia Belline, Marie-Pierre Pasdelou, and Sylvie Pucheu.'

In 2017, the company established a subsidiary in Boston and partnered with Cbset, a biomedical research firm, to commercialize regulatory toxicology services for hearing-related treatments. Cilcare also collaborated with Draper to develop an intracochlear drug delivery system.

In 2020, Cilcare expanded its activities to Denmark and acquired 4 proprietary drug candidates from Sanofi's portfolio.

In 2021, the company signed a partnership with Knotus, a South Korean non-clinical CRO, to develop therapies for preventing and treating hearing loss.

In 2023, Cilcare, collaborated with SATT AxLR and the Laboratory of Bioengineering and Nanosciences at the University of Montpellier, to launch OrgaEar. This project uses induced pluripotent stem cells and 3D cultures to create cochlear organoids, enabling the study and development of treatments for deafness without animal testing.'

In June 2024, Cilcare and Shionogi announced an exclusive option agreement, granting Shionogi worldwide licensing rights to two drug candidates, CIL001 and CIL003, for treating hearing disorders such as hidden hearing loss and tinnitus.

In December 2024, Cilcare raised €21 million from investors, including Shionogi, Multi Invest VCC, and SPRIM Global Investments, bringing its total funding to €40 million.

In early 2025, Cilcare initiated the SAPHIR study (early Stage of Alzheimer’s and Parkinson’s diseases, HearIng Relevance) in collaboration with the University Hospitals of Montpellier and Nîmes, exploring the link between hearing loss and neurodegenerative diseases.

In early 2026, Cilcare announced the opening of a subsidiary in Japan. In June 2026, the company revised its licensing agreement with Sanofi, which became a minority shareholder, and received funding from the European Regional Development Fund (ERDF).

== Recognition ==
In October 2022, the company, in collaboration with CBSET, won the Hearing Technology Innovator Award in the "Therapeutics" category. In May 2023, Cilcare was awarded the Women in Business Award by the French-American Chamber of Commerce of New England (FACCNE). The company was also selected for the ScaleUp Excellence program in July 2023.

In June 2024, Cilcare secured €4.2 million in funding through the i-Démo Call for Projects under France’s Plan France 2030 initiative. Later that year, in September 2024, the company received its second Hearing Technology Innovator Award for its drug candidate CIL001. In 2025, Cilcare won EEN (Enterprise Europe Network) Award.
