= Damoctocog alfa pegol =

Chemical compound

Clinical data
- Trade names: Jivi
- Other names: BAY94-9027, antihemophilic factor (recombinant), pegylated-aucl
- AHFS/Drugs.com: Monograph
- License data: US DailyMed: Damoctocog alfa
- Pregnancy category: AU: B2
- Routes of administration: Intravenous
- ATC code: B02BD02 (WHO)

Legal status
- Legal status: AU: S4 (Prescription only); CA: ℞-only / Schedule D; US: ℞-only; EU: Rx-only; In general: ℞ (Prescription only)

Identifiers
- CAS Number: 1363853-26-2
- DrugBank: DB14700
- UNII: BY4TSK952Y
- KEGG: D10759

Chemical and physical data
- Formula: C_{7445}H_{11318}N_{1984}O_{2184}S_{69}
- Molar mass: 165774.28 g·mol^{−1}

Damoctocog alfa pegol, sold under the brand name Jivi is a recombinant DNA-derived, Factor VIII concentrate used to treat hemophilia A.

The most common side effects include headache, cough, nausea, and fever.

Damoctocog alfa pegol was approved for medical use in the United States in August 2018, and in the European Union in November 2018.

== Medical uses ==
In the United States damoctocog alfa pegol is indicated for use in previously treated people twelve years of age and older with hemophilia A (congenital Factor VIII deficiency) for on-demand treatment and control of bleeding episodes; perioperative management of bleeding; or routine prophylaxis to reduce the frequency of bleeding episodes.

In the European Union, damoctocog alfa pegol is indicated for the treatment and prophylaxis of bleeding in previously treated people twelve years of age and older with hemophilia A (congenital factor VIII deficiency).
