= Aminomethylbenzoic acid =

Chemical compound

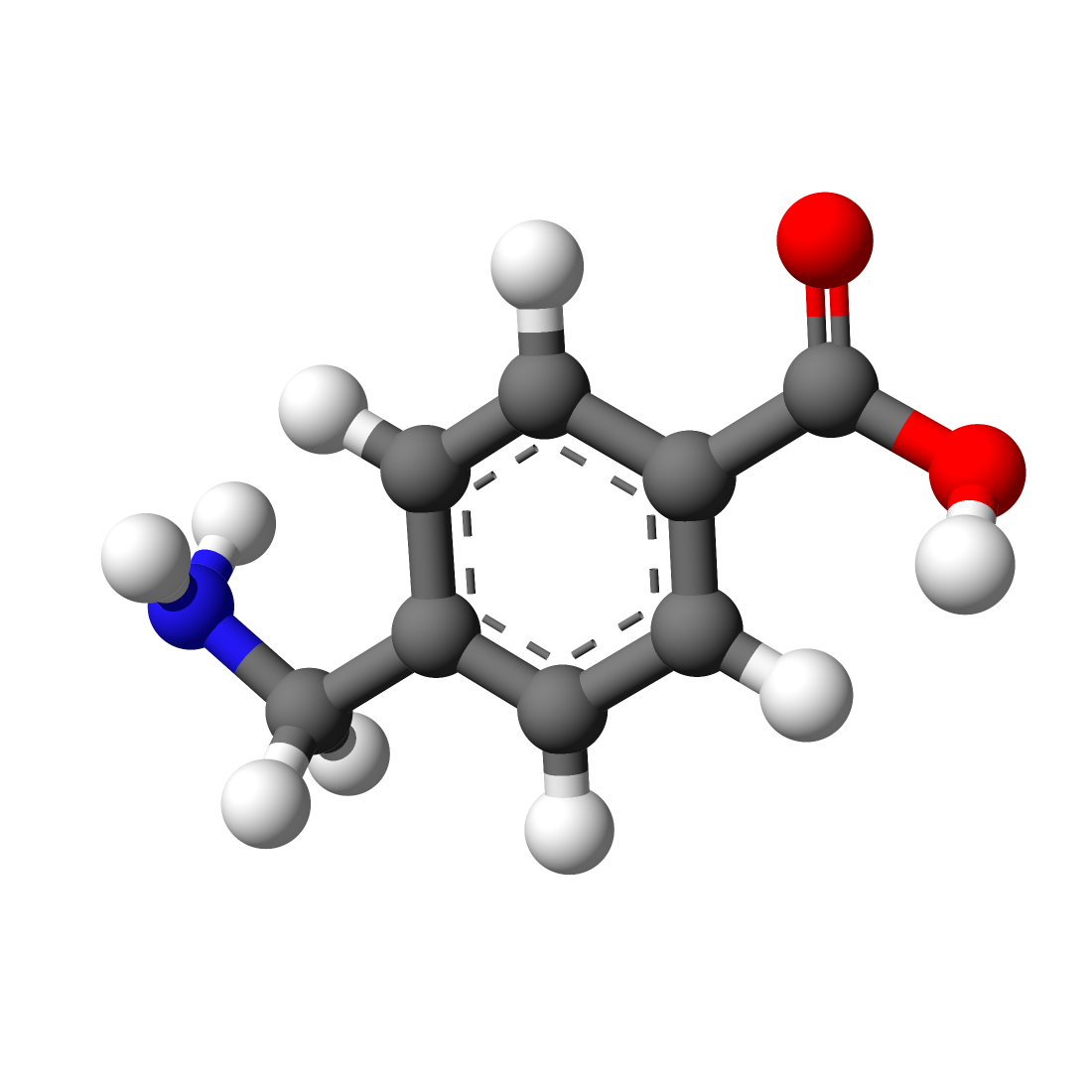

Clinical data
- AHFS/Drugs.com: International Drug Names
- ATC code: B02AA03 (WHO)

Legal status
- Legal status: US: ℞-only

Identifiers
- IUPAC name: 4-(aminomethyl)benzoic acid
- CAS Number: 56-91-7
- PubChem CID: 65526
- IUPHAR/BPS: 4702
- ChemSpider: 58971
- UNII: 68WG9JKC7L
- KEGG: D07568
- ChEMBL: ChEMBL328875
- CompTox Dashboard (EPA): DTXSID20204568
- ECHA InfoCard: 100.000.271

Chemical and physical data
- Formula: C_{8}H_{9}NO_{2}
- Molar mass: 151.165 g·mol^{−1}
- 3D model (JSmol): Interactive image
- Density: 1.239 g/cm^{3}
- Melting point: 300 °C (572 °F)
- Boiling point: 310.7 °C (591.3 °F)
- SMILES: O=C(O)c1ccc(cc1)CN
- InChI: InChI=1S/C8H9NO2/c9-5-6-1-3-7(4-2-6)8(10)11/h1-4H,5,9H2,(H,10,11); Key:QCTBMLYLENLHLA-UHFFFAOYSA-N

Aminomethylbenzoic acid (more precisely, 4-aminomethylbenzoic acid or p-aminomethylbenzoic acid, PAMBA) is an antifibrinolytic.

== See also ==
- 4-Aminobenzoic acid
