= N-0385 =

Chemical compound

Clinical data
- Other names: Ms-QFR-Kbt
- Routes of administration: Intranasal

Identifiers
- IUPAC name: (2S)-N-[(2S)-1-[[(2S)-1-(1,3-benzothiazol-2-yl)-5-(diaminomethylideneamino)-1-oxopentan-2-yl]amino]-1-oxo-3-phenylpropan-2-yl]-2-(methanesulfonamido)pentanediamide
- CAS Number: 2230674-01-6
- PubChem CID: 135169285
- IUPHAR/BPS: 11956

Chemical and physical data
- Formula: C_{28}H_{36}N_{8}O_{6}S_{2}
- Molar mass: 644.77 g·mol^{−1}
- 3D model (JSmol): Interactive image
- SMILES: CS(=O)(=O)NC(CCC(=O)N)C(=O)NC(CC1=CC=CC=C1)C(=O)NC(CCCN=C(N)N)C(=O)C2=NC3=CC=CC=C3S2
- InChI: InChI=1S/C28H36N8O6S2/c1-44(41,42)36-20(13-14-23(29)37)25(39)34-21(16-17-8-3-2-4-9-17)26(40)33-19(11-7-15-32-28(30)31)24(38)27-35-18-10-5-6-12-22(18)43-27/h2-6,8-10,12,19-21,36H,7,11,13-16H2,1H3,(H2,29,37)(H,33,40)(H,34,39)(H4,30,31,32)/t19-,20-,21-/m0/s1; Key:JTHVOFMYRRNGPA-ACRUOGEOSA-N

N-0385 is an experimental small molecule TMPRSS2-inhibitor being investigated for its potential use in the prevention and treatment of COVID-19.

== Mechanism of action ==
N-0385 is thought to have antiviral effects by targeting key proteins involved in the viral entry process, including TMPRSS2, ACE2, and DPP4. By interfering with the interactions between these proteins and the SARS-CoV-2 spike protein, N-0385 effectively blocks the virus from gaining access to host cells. Additionally, N-0385 appears to modify the immune responses and inflammatory pathways associated with the infection by regulating TLR7, NLRP3, and IL-10, potentially reducing the severity of COVID-19 symptoms and reducing tissue damage associated with the infection.
