= Ensitrelvir =

COVID-19 SARS-CoV-2 3CL-protease-inhibitor antiviral drug

- Skeletal structure of ensitrelvir

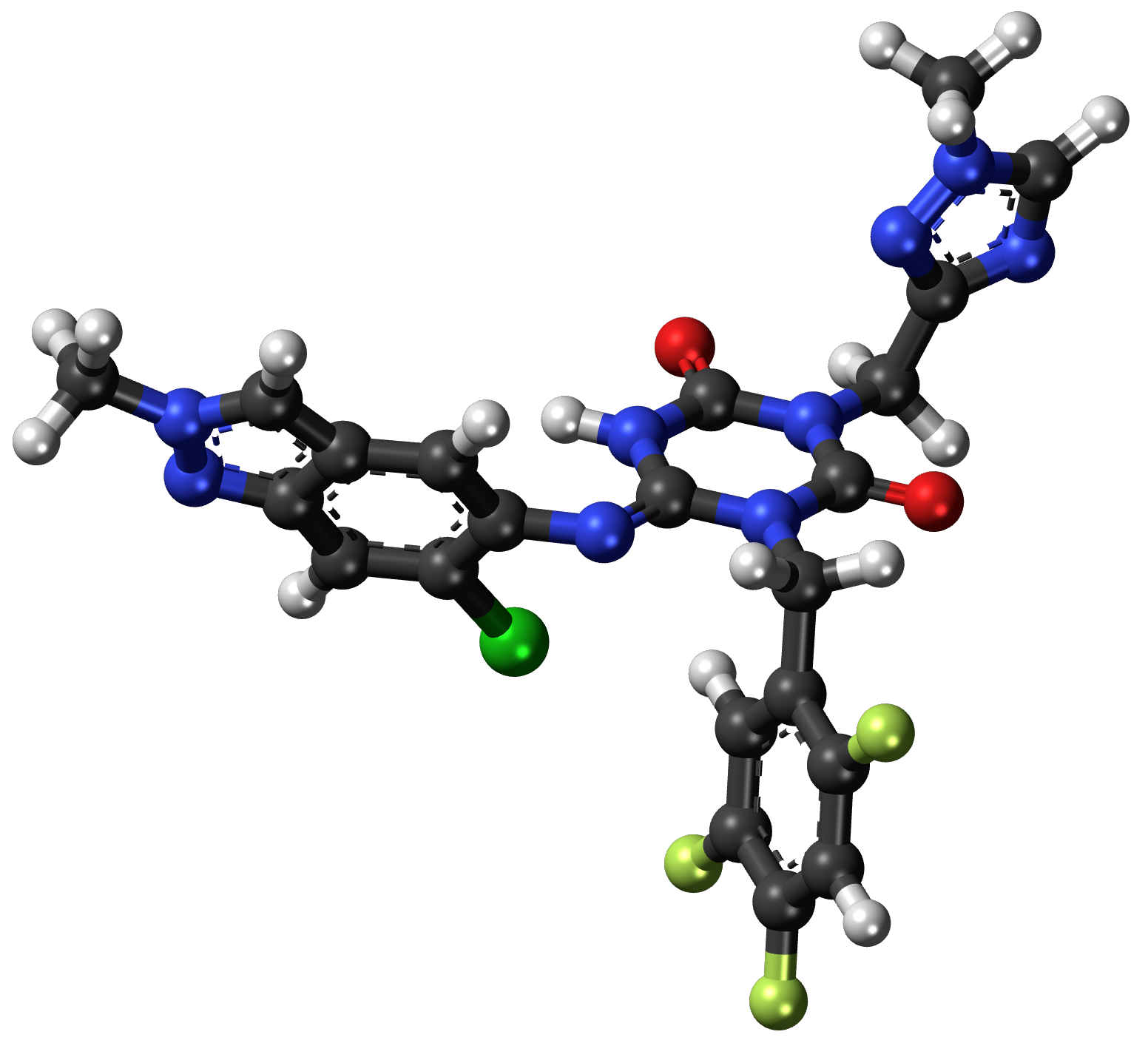
- 3D representation of an ensitrelvir molecule

Clinical data
- Trade names: Xocova, Zokovea
- Other names: S-217622
- AHFS/Drugs.com: Multum Consumer Information
- MedlinePlus: a626074
- License data: US DailyMed: Ensitrelvir
- Routes of administration: By mouth
- ATC code: J05AE11 (WHO)

Legal status
- Legal status: US: ℞-only; EU: Rx-only; JP: Rx-only

Pharmacokinetic data
- Elimination half-life: 42–48 hours

Identifiers
- IUPAC name: 1-(2,4,5-Trifluorobenzyl)-3-[(1-methyl-1H-1,2,4-triazol-3-yl)methyl]-(6E)-6-[(6-chloro-2-methyl-2H-indazol-5-yl)imino]-1,3,5-triazinane-2,4-dione
- CAS Number: 2647530-73-0; 2757470-18-9
- PubChem CID: 162533924
- DrugBank: DB18834
- ChemSpider: 115007411
- UNII: PX665RAA3H
- KEGG: D12353
- PDB ligand: 7YY (PDBe, RCSB PDB)

Chemical and physical data
- Formula: C_{22}H_{17}ClF_{3}N_{9}O_{2}
- Molar mass: 531.88 g·mol^{−1}
- 3D model (JSmol): Interactive image
- SMILES: Cn1cnc(CN2C(=O)N(Cc3cc(F)c(F)cc3F)C(=N\c3cc4cn(C)nc4cc3Cl)\NC2=O)n1
- InChI: InChI=1S/C22H17ClF3N9O2/c1-32-7-12-4-18(13(23)5-17(12)30-32)28-20-29-21(36)35(9-19-27-10-33(2)31-19)22(37)34(20)8-11-3-15(25)16(26)6-14(11)24/h3-7,10H,8-9H2,1-2H3,(H,28,29,36); Key:QMPBBNUOBOFBFS-UHFFFAOYSA-N

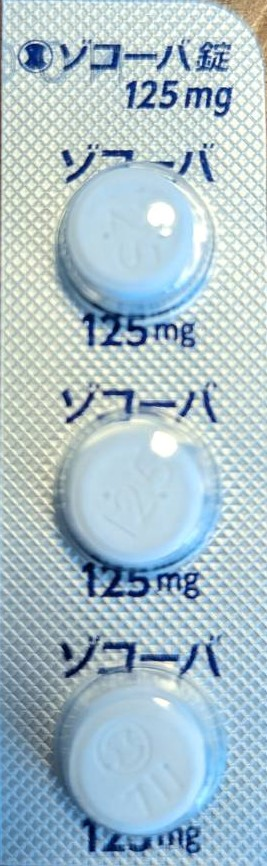
Xocova in a Japanese blister pack

Ensitrelvir, sold under the brand names Xocova and Zokovea, is an antiviral medication used as a treatment for COVID-19 and as post-exposure prophylaxis (PEP) to prevent COVID-19 infections following exposure. It was developed by Shionogi in partnership with Hokkaido University and acts as an orally active 3C-like protease inhibitor. It is taken by mouth.

The most common adverse events include transient decreases in high-density lipoprotein and increased blood triglycerides.

== Medical uses ==
Ensitrelvir is indicated for the treatment of COVID-19, and as post-exposure prophylaxis (PEP) to prevent COVID-19 infections following exposure to the SARS-CoV-2 virus.

== History ==
As of 2022, ensitrelvir had reached phase III clinical trials. The Japanese government is reportedly considering allowing Shionogi permission to apply for approval for medical use before the final steps of trials are completed, potentially speeding up the release for sale. This conditional early approval system has previously been used in Japan to accelerate the progression to market of other antiviral drugs targeting COVID-19, including remdesivir and molnupiravir. In a study of 428 patients, viral load was reduced, but symptoms were not significantly reduced.

In February 2022, the company sought emergency approval from regulators in Japan.

Shionogi announced they had reached a preliminary agreement to supply 1 million doses to the Japanese government once the drug is approved. The CEO said they could have capacity to make 10 million doses a year.

== Society and culture ==
=== Legal status ===
Ensitrelvir was approved for emergency use in Japan in November 2022, before gaining full approval in March 2024. It was approved in Singapore in November 2023.

In May 2026, ensitrelvir was approved for medical use in the United States.

In September 2026, ensitrelvir was authorized for medical use in the European Union.

=== Names ===
Ensitrelvir is the international nonproprietary name (INN).

Ensitrelvir is sold under the brand names Xocova and Zokovea.

== Research ==
Ensitrelvir may be effective in treating smell and taste loss from COVID-19 infection. In a 2023 study, the drug was associated with a 39% reduction in these symptoms.

Ensitrelvir has been investigated for use as potential post-exposure prophylaxis (PEP) for SARS-CoV-2 infection. The SCORPIO-PEP trial, a global Phase 3 study, assessed the safety and efficacy of ensitrelvir in preventing symptomatic COVID-19 among household contacts of individuals with confirmed SARS-CoV-2 infection. In 2025, the trial found the treatment with ensitrelvir significantly reduced the incidence of symptomatic COVID-19 in people who had a household exposure to the illness compared to a placebo. In clinical observations, only 2.9% of the ensitrelvir group developed symptoms, versus 9.0% in the control group, representing a 67% reduction in risk. In 2026, in a study conducted from June 2023 to September 2024, ~9% of people who received a placebo within 72 hours of a housemate developing symptoms became symptomatic, versus ~3% of those who got a five-day course of ensitrelvir.

An April 2024 pre-clinical study in a mouse model investigating ensitrelvir demonstrated its potential use as a pre-exposure prophylactic (PrEP) against developing COVID-19. When administered 24 hours before viral exposure, a single dose of ensitrelvir significantly increased survival rates, inhibited weight loss, and suppressed viral replication in aged mice.

A retrospective study conducted between November 2022 and July 2023 using a large Japanese health insurance database suggested that ensitrelvir may be effective in reducing hospitalization risk in outpatients at high risk for severe COVID-19. The study found a significantly lower risk of hospitalization and a reduced need for respiratory monitoring and oxygen therapy in the ensitrelvir group compared to the control group. In addition, other clinical study shows that early ensitrelvir treatment resulted in rapid symptom relief and significant viral load reduction, with no adverse events, viral rebound, or PASC symptoms, demonstrating its potential efficacy and safety.

In May 2024, Shionogi announced that in a phase III trial (SCORPIO-HR), ensitrelvir did not achieve its primary endpoint of a statistically significant reduction in the time to sustained resolution of 15 common COVID-19 symptoms compared to placebo. However, the drug did meet key secondary endpoints, including demonstrating a significant reduction in viral RNA levels, a shorter time to achieve the first negative infectious viral titer in nasal swabs compared to placebo, and a shorter resolution time of 6 symptoms.
