= Absorbable gelatin sponge =

Material used to control blood flow

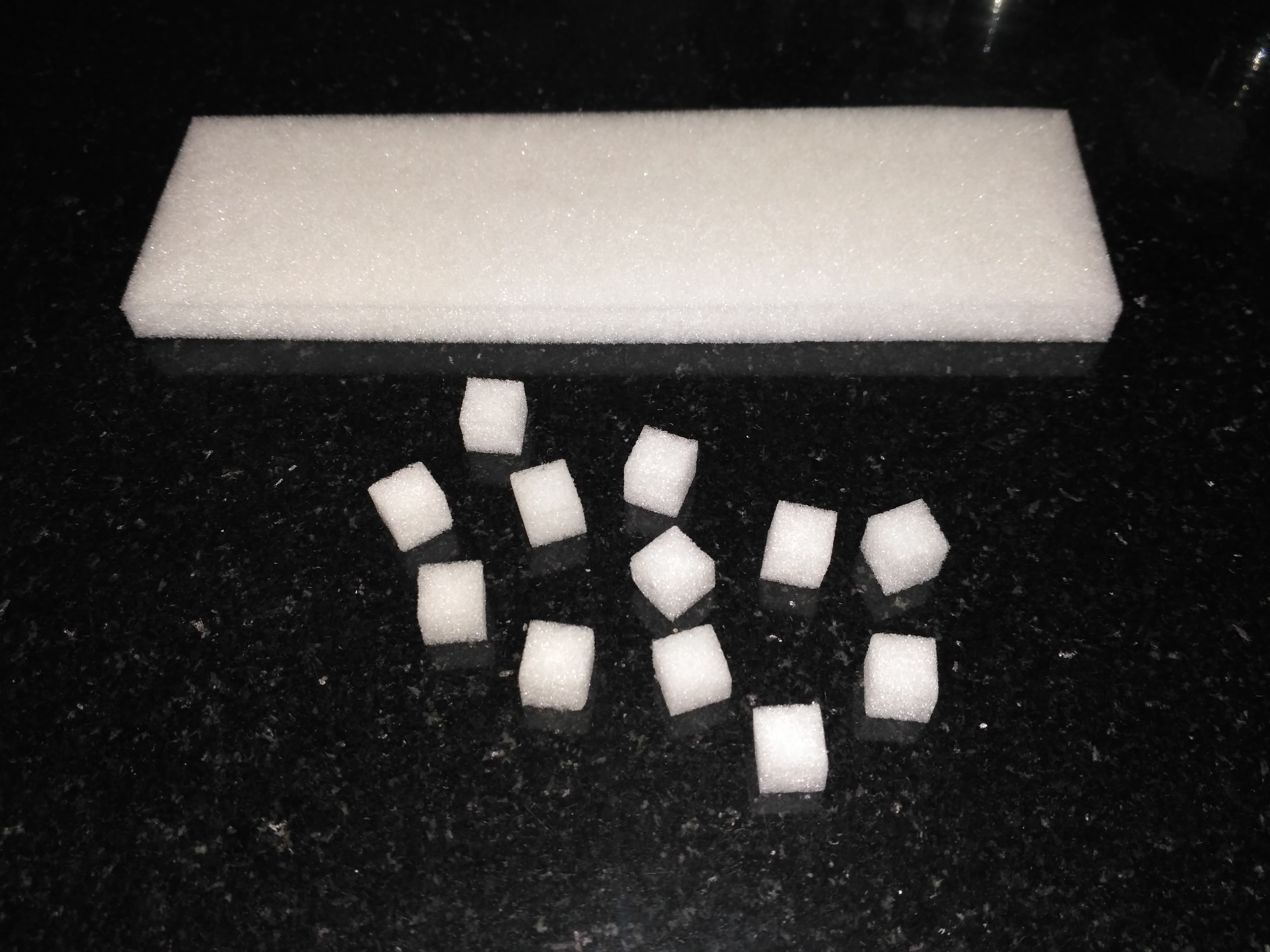

An absorbable gelatin sponge is a sterile hemostatic agent composed of purified porcine-derived gelatin. In regional chemotherapy, absorbable gelatin sponge may be used to embolize arteries in the region of a tumor in order to block or retard blood flow; this blockage results in a locally increased concentration of chemotherapeutic agents delivered to the tumor when chemotherapeutic agents are infused into the embolized arterial circulation upstream of the blockage. It is sometimes soaked with buprenorphine.
