= Lusutrombopag =

Chemical compound

Clinical data
- Pronunciation: loo" soo trom' boe pag
- Trade names: Mulpleta, Mulpleo
- AHFS/Drugs.com: Monograph
- MedlinePlus: a618043
- License data: EU EMA: by INN; US DailyMed: Lusutrombopag
- Routes of administration: By mouth
- ATC code: B02BX07 (WHO)

Legal status
- Legal status: US: ℞-only; EU: Rx-only; In general: ℞ (Prescription only)

Identifiers
- IUPAC name: (E)-3-[2,6-Dichloro-4-[[4-[3-[(1S)-1-hexoxyethyl]-2-methoxyphenyl]-1,3-thiazol-2-yl]carbamoyl]phenyl]-2-methylprop-2-enoic acid
- CAS Number: 1110766-97-6
- PubChem CID: 49843517
- DrugBank: DB13125
- ChemSpider: 21106301
- UNII: 6LL5JFU42F
- KEGG: D10476
- ChEMBL: ChEMBL461101
- CompTox Dashboard (EPA): DTXSID701027951

Chemical and physical data
- Formula: C_{29}H_{32}Cl_{2}N_{2}O_{5}S
- Molar mass: 591.54 g·mol^{−1}
- 3D model (JSmol): Interactive image
- SMILES: CCCCCCO[C@@H](C)c1cccc(-c2csc(NC(=O)c3cc(Cl)c(/C=C(\C)C(=O)O)c(Cl)c3)n2)c1OC
- InChI: InChI=1S/C29H32Cl2N2O5S/c1-5-6-7-8-12-38-18(3)20-10-9-11-21(26(20)37-4)25-16-39-29(32-25)33-27(34)19-14-23(30)22(24(31)15-19)13-17(2)28(35)36/h9-11,13-16,18H,5-8,12H2,1-4H3,(H,35,36)(H,32,33,34)/b17-13+/t18-/m0/s1; Key:NOZIJMHMKORZBA-KJCUYJGMSA-N

Lusutrombopag, sold under the brand name Mulpleta among others, is a medication that has been developed for certain conditions that lead to thrombocytopenia (abnormally low platelet counts) such as thrombocytopenia associated with chronic liver disease in patients prior to elective invasive procedures. It is being manufactured in Philadelphia, PA and marketed in Japan by Shionogi. It was approved by the U.S. Food and Drug Administration (FDA) in July 2018, and NICE in January 2020.

It was approved for medical use in the European Union in February 2019.
