= Calu-3 =

Calu-3 is a human lung cancer cell line commonly used in cancer research and drug development. Calu-3 cells are epithelial and can act as respiratory models in preclinical applications.

Calu-3 cells were first derived in 1975 by Germain Trempe and Jorgen Fogh of the Memorial Sloan Kettering Cancer Center. The cells were isolated from the pleural effusion of a 25-year-old Caucasian male with a lung adenocarcinoma.

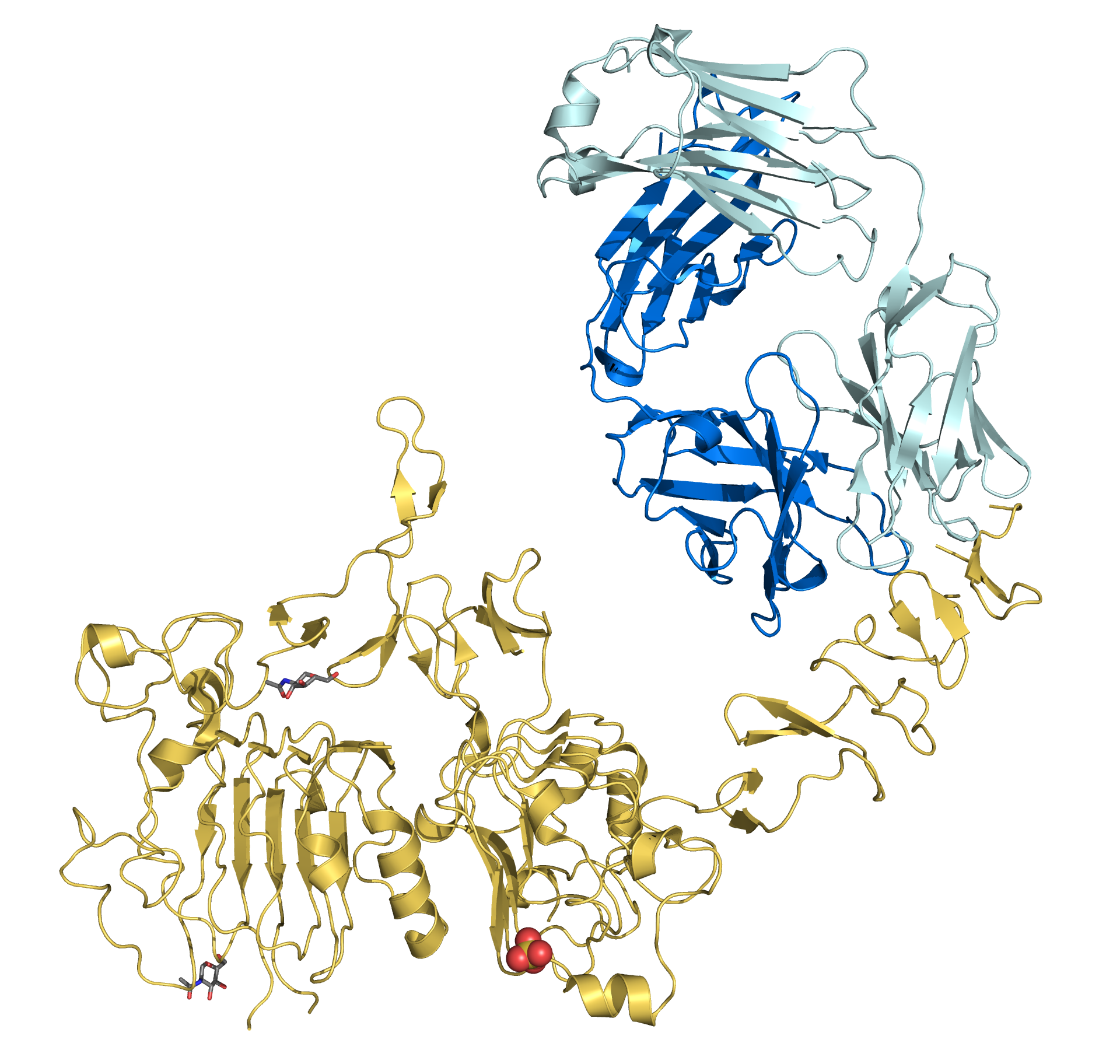
The ERBB2 gene is overexpressed in Calu-3 cells, and plays a role in aggressive cancer proliferation

The Calu-3 cell line grows as an adherent monolayer and overexpresses the ERBB2 gene, leading to active ErbB2/Her2. The cells also express CK7, occludin, and E-cadherin. Calu-3 cells also have large amounts of cystic fibrosis transmembrane conductance regulator.

Calu-3 cells are commonly used as both in vitro and in vivo models for drug development against lung cancer. The cells have been used in studies of pulmonary drug delivery, demonstrating a capacity to intake low molecular weight substances. Calu-3 cells have served as respiratory models for air intake and lung injury due to their responsiveness to foreign substances. The Calu-3 cell line has shown to be useful in the study of chloride ion secretion by lung epithelial cells. The cells may be used in high-throughput screening applications focused on barrier integrity and surface protein expression of lung cells.
