= ATC code B02 =

ATC code B02 Antihemorrhagics is a therapeutic subgroup of the Anatomical Therapeutic Chemical Classification System, a system of alphanumeric codes developed by the World Health Organization (WHO) for the classification of drugs and other medical products. Subgroup B02 is part of the anatomical group B Blood and blood forming organs.

Codes for veterinary use (ATCvet codes) can be created by placing the letter Q in front of the human ATC code: for example, QB02.
National versions of the ATC classification may include additional codes not present in this list, which follows the WHO version.

== B02A Antifibrinolytics ==
=== B02AA Amino acids ===
B02AA01 Aminocaproic acid
B02AA02 Tranexamic acid
B02AA03 Aminomethylbenzoic acid

=== B02AB Proteinase inhibitors ===
B02AB01 Aprotinin
B02AB02 Alfa1 antitrypsin
B02AB04 Camostat
B02AB05 Ulinastatin

== B02B Vitamin K and other hemostatics ==
=== B02BA Vitamin K ===
B02BA01 Phytomenadione
B02BA02 Menadione

=== B02BB Fibrinogen ===
B02BB01 Human fibrinogen

=== B02BC Local hemostatics ===
B02BC01 Absorbable gelatin sponge
B02BC02 Oxidized cellulose
B02BC03 Tetragalacturonic acid hydroxymethylester
B02BC05 Adrenalone
B02BC06 Thrombin
B02BC07 Collagen
B02BC08 Calcium alginate
B02BC09 Epinephrine
B02BC30 Combinations; e.g. Fibrin glue

=== B02BD Blood coagulation factors ===
B02BD01 Coagulation factor IX, II, VII and X in combination (Prothrombin complex concentrate)
B02BD02 Coagulation factor VIII
B02BD03 Factor VIII inhibitor bypassing activity
B02BD04 Coagulation factor IX
B02BD05 Coagulation factor VII
B02BD06 von Willebrand factor and coagulation factor VIII in combination
B02BD07 Coagulation factor XIII
B02BD08 Coagulation factor VIIa
B02BD10 von Willebrand factor
B02BD11 Catridecacog
B02BD13 Coagulation factor X
B02BD14 Susoctocog alfa
B02BD15 Valoctocogene roxaparvovec
B02BD16 Etranacogene dezaparvovec
B02BD17 Fidanacogene elaparvovec
B02BD18 Arvenacogene sanparvovec
B02BD30 Thrombin

=== B02BX Other systemic hemostatics ===
B02BX01 Etamsylate
B02BX02 Carbazochrome
B02BX03 Batroxobin
B02BX04 Romiplostim
B02BX05 Eltrombopag
B02BX06 Emicizumab
B02BX07 Lusutrombopag
B02BX08 Avatrombopag
B02BX09 Fostamatinib
B02BX10 Concizumab
B02BX11 Marstacimab
B02BX12 Fitusiran
