= Interleukin 11 =

Protein-coding gene in the species Homo sapiens

IL11
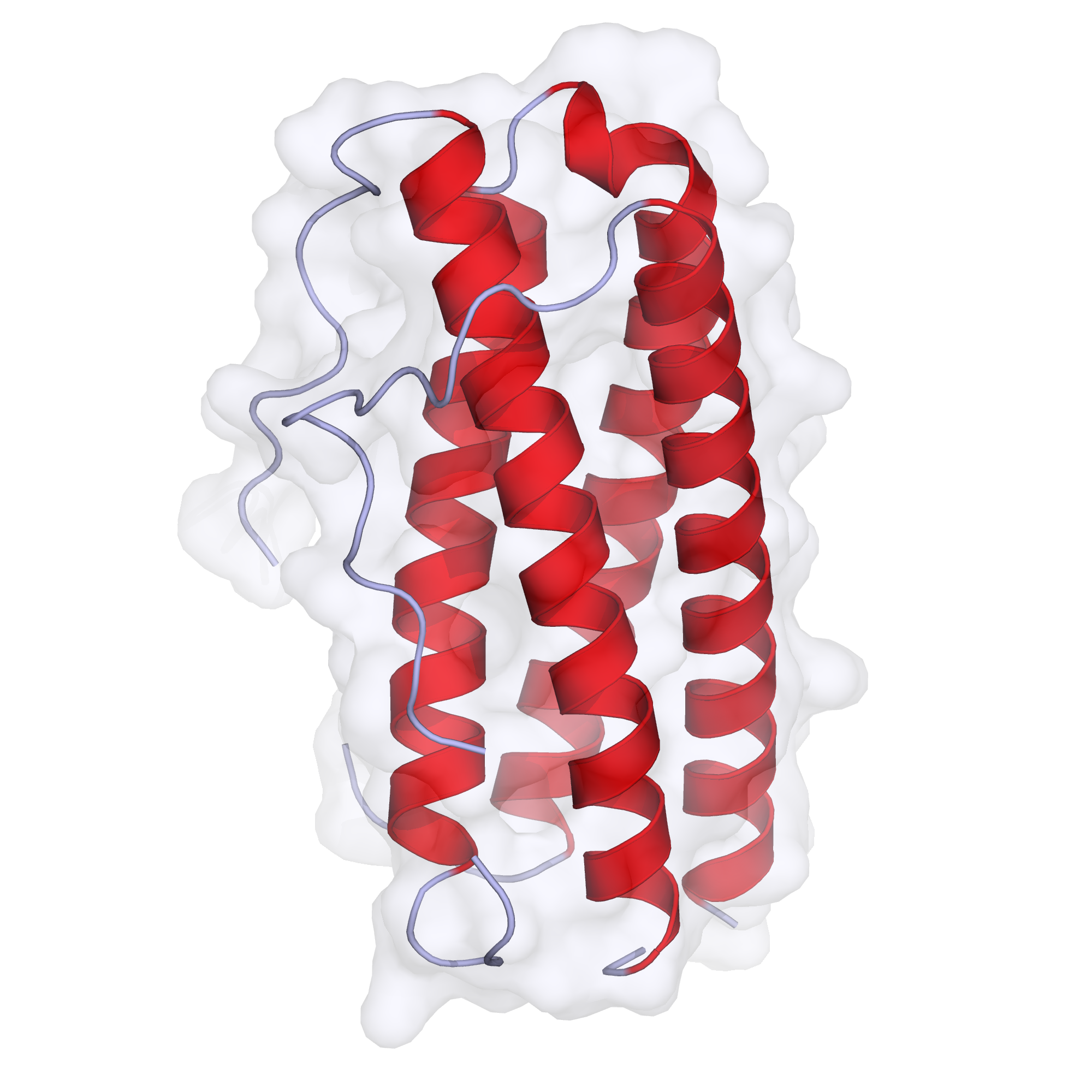

Identifiers
- Aliases: IL11, AGIF, IL-11, interleukin 11
- External IDs: OMIM: 147681; MGI: 107613; GeneCards: IL11
Available structures
PDB	Ortholog search: PDBe RCSB
PDB	List of PDB id codes 4MHL

Gene location (Human)
Chr.	Chromosome 19 (human)
Band	19q13.42	Start	55,364,382 bp
Band	19q13.42	End	55,370,463 bp

Gene location (Mouse)
Chr.	Chromosome 7 (mouse)
Band	7 A1|7 2.76 cM	Start	4,775,372 bp
Band	7 A1|7 2.76 cM	End	4,785,858 bp
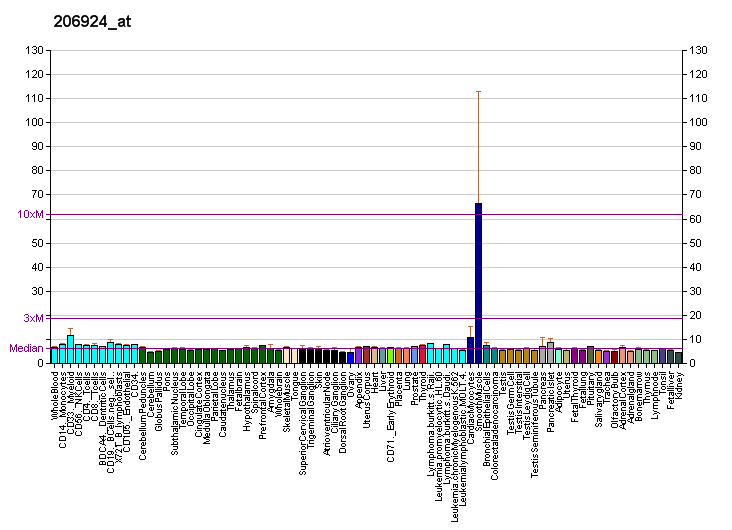

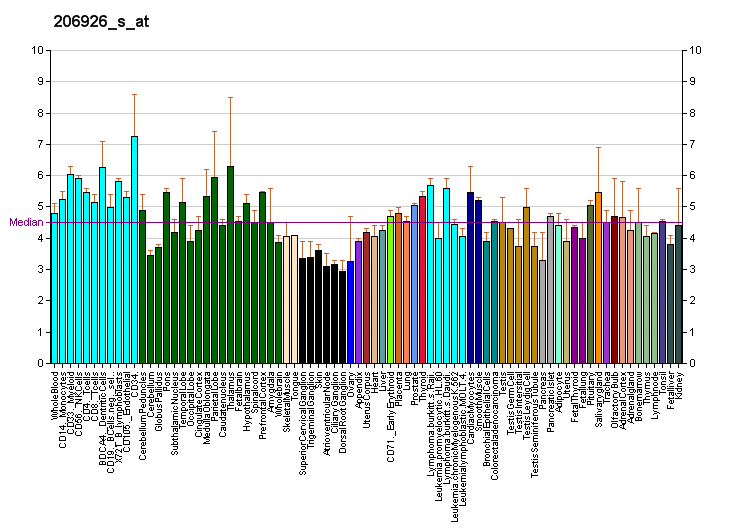
RNA expression pattern
Bgee	Human / Mouse (ortholog); Top expressed in: islet of Langerhans; cartilage tissue; stromal cell of endometrium; right hemisphere of cerebellum; mucosa of urinary bladder; cecum; hypothalamus; anterior pituitary; appendix; gallbladder / Top expressed in: gastrula; spermatid; embryo; seminiferous tubule; spermatocyte; central gray substance of midbrain; muscle; lip; cerebellum; nucleus of stria terminalis; More reference expression data
BioGPS	More reference expression data
Gene ontology
Molecular function	growth factor activity; interleukin-11 receptor binding; cytokine activity; protein binding
Cellular component	cytoplasm; extracellular space; extracellular region
Biological process	negative regulation of endothelial cell apoptotic process; positive regulation of MAPK cascade; positive regulation of peptidyl-serine phosphorylation; B cell differentiation; positive regulation of transcription by RNA polymerase II; negative regulation of hormone secretion; positive regulation of peptidyl-tyrosine phosphorylation; fat cell differentiation; positive regulation of cell population proliferation; regulation of complement-dependent cytotoxicity; megakaryocyte differentiation; regulation of signaling receptor activity; cytokine-mediated signaling pathway; cardiovascular fibrosis
Sources:Amigo / QuickGO
Orthologs
Databases	NCBI: entry; OMA: entry
Species	Human	Mouse
Entrez	3589	16156
Ensembl	ENSG00000095752	ENSMUSG00000004371
UniProt	P20809	P47873
RefSeq (mRNA)	NM_001267718; NM_000641	NM_008350; NM_001290423
RefSeq (protein)	NP_000632; NP_001254647	NP_001277352; NP_032376
Location (UCSC)	Chr 19: 55.36 – 55.37 Mb	Chr 7: 4.78 – 4.79 Mb
PubMed search
- Wikidata
View/Edit Human	View/Edit Mouse

Interleukin 11 (IL-11 or adipogenesis inhibitory factor) is a protein that in humans is encoded by the IL11 gene.

IL-11 is a cytokine that was first isolated in 1990 from bone marrow-derived fibrocyte-like stromal cells. It was initially thought to be important for hematopoiesis, notably for megakaryocyte maturation, but subsequently shown to be redundant for platelets, and for other blood cell types, in both mice and humans. It was developed as a recombinant protein (rhIL-11) as the drug substance oprelvekin.

The human IL-11 gene, consisting of 5 exons and 4 introns, is located on chromosome 19, and encodes a 23 kDa protein. IL-11 is a member of the IL-6-type cytokine family, distinguished based on their use of the common co-receptor gp130. Signal specificity is provided by the IL-11Rα subunit which is expressed at high levels in fibroblasts and other stromal cells but not immune cells, unlike IL6 receptors that are expressed at highest levels in immune cells and lowly expressed in stromal cells.

== Downstream signalling ==
Signal transduction is initiated upon binding of IL-11 to IL-11Rα and gp130, facilitating the formation of higher order structures involving dimers of gp130:Il-11:Il11RA complexes. In some instances, in epithelial-derived cells and cancer cell lines, this permits gp130-associated Janus kinases (JAK) activation and downstream STAT-mediated transcriptional activities. In other instances, in stromal cells, IL-11 activates non-canonical MAPK/ERK-dependent signalling to initiate the post-transcriptional upregulation of specific subsets of transcripts in the absence of an effect on transcription. In fibroblasts, IL-11 drives an ERK-dependent autocrine loop of fibrogenic protein synthesis that is at a nexus of fibrotic signalling and required for the pro-fibrotic activity of TGFB1, PDGF, endothelin1, angiotensin and many other pro-fibrotic factors. IL-11 has also been described in various aspects of tissue regeneration, predominantly in regenerative species like the zebrafish or the axolotl. Here, activation of STAT3 by IL-11 is mandatory to allow regeneration and to prevent injury-induced fibrotic remodeling and scar formation.

== Function ==
IL-11 through its binding to its transmembrane IL-11Rα receptor and resultant activation of downstream signaling pathways has been thought to regulate adipogenesis, osteoclastogenesis, neurogenesis and platelet maturation. More recently it has been discovered that over-expression of IL-11 is associated with a variety of cancers and may provide a link between inflammation and cancer.

IL-11 has been demonstrated to improve platelet recovery after chemotherapy-induced thrombocytopenia, induce acute phase proteins, modulate antigen-antibody responses, participate in the regulation of bone cell proliferation and differentiation IL-11 causes bone-resorption. It stimulates the growth of certain lymphocytes and, in the murine model, stimulates an increase in the cortical thickness and strength of long bones. In addition to having lymphopoietic/hematopoietic and osteotrophic properties, it has functions in many other tissues, including the brain, gut, testis, kidney and bone.

As a signaling molecule, interleukin 11 has a variety of functions associated with its receptor interleukin 11 receptor alpha; such functions include placentation and to some extent decidualization. IL11 has a role during blastocyst implantation in the uteral endometrium; as the blastocyst is imbedded within the endometrium, extravillous trophoblasts invade the maternal spiral arteries for stability and the transfer of life-sustaining elements via the maternal and fetal circulatory systems. This process is highly regulated due to detrimental consequences that can arise from aberrations of the placentation process: poor infiltration of trophoblasts may result in preeclampsia, while severely invasive trophoblasts may resolve in placenta accreta, increta or percreta; all defects that most likely would result in the early demise of the embryo and/or negative effects upon the mother. IL11 is present in the decidua and chorionic villi to regulate the extent in which the placenta implants itself; regulations to ensure maternal well-being and the growth and survival of the fetus. A murine knockout model has been produced for this particular gene, with initial studies involving IL11 role in bone pathologies but have since progressed to fertility research; further research utilizes endometrial and gestational tissue from humans.

== Therapeutic target ==
A recombinant form of IL-11, oprelvekin, is a protein therapeutic used for the prevention of severe thrombocytopenia in cancer patients.

As IL-11 over-expression is associated with a number of cancers, inhibition of its signaling pathway may have utility in treating cancer, and has also been researched for its potential ability to slow down aging.

Transforming growth factor β1 (TGFβ1) through up-regulation of IL-11, stimulates collagen production and is important in wound healing. However dysregulation of TGFβ1 and downstream IL-11 is associated with fibrotic diseases hence inhibition of IL-11 may have utility in treating fibrosis. This cytokine promotes recruitment of immune suppressive cancer-associated fibroblasts to tumors and facilitates chemoresistance.

It is also under investigation as a way to allow diabetes-damaged kidney tissue to regenerate.

== See also ==
- Thrombopoietic agent
- Genetics of aging
