= Avatrombopag =

Chemical compound

Clinical data
- Pronunciation: a" va trom' boe pag
- Trade names: Doptelet
- AHFS/Drugs.com: Monograph
- MedlinePlus: a618032
- License data: US DailyMed: Avatrombopag
- Pregnancy category: AU: B3
- Routes of administration: By mouth
- ATC code: B02BX08 (WHO)

Legal status
- Legal status: AU: S4 (Prescription only); CA: ℞-only; US: ℞-only; EU: Rx-only; In general: ℞ (Prescription only)

Identifiers
- IUPAC name: 1-[3-Chloro-5-[[4-(4-chlorothiophen-2-yl)-5-(4-cyclohexylpiperazin-1-yl)-1,3-thiazol-2-yl]carbamoyl]pyridin-2-yl]piperidine-4-carboxylic acid
- CAS Number: 570406-98-3
- PubChem CID: 9852519
- DrugBank: DB11995
- ChemSpider: 8028230
- UNII: 3H8GSZ4SQL
- KEGG: D10306; as salt: D10307
- ChEMBL: ChEMBL2103883
- CompTox Dashboard (EPA): DTXSID30205667

Chemical and physical data
- Formula: C_{29}H_{34}Cl_{2}N_{6}O_{3}S_{2}
- Molar mass: 649.65 g·mol^{−1}
- 3D model (JSmol): Interactive image
- SMILES: C1CCC(CC1)N2CCN(CC2)C3=C(N=C(S3)NC(=O)C4=CC(=C(N=C4)N5CCC(CC5)C(=O)O)Cl)C6=CC(=CS6)Cl
- InChI: InChI=1S/C29H34Cl2N6O3S2/c30-20-15-23(41-17-20)24-27(37-12-10-35(11-13-37)21-4-2-1-3-5-21)42-29(33-24)34-26(38)19-14-22(31)25(32-16-19)36-8-6-18(7-9-36)28(39)40/h14-18,21H,1-13H2,(H,39,40)(H,33,34,38); Key:OFZJKCQENFPZBH-UHFFFAOYSA-N

Avatrombopag, sold under the brand name Doptelet, is a medication that is used for certain conditions that lead to thrombocytopenia (low platelets) such as thrombocytopenia associated with chronic liver disease in adults who are to undergo a planned medical or dental procedure. It was approved for medical use in the United States in May 2018, the European Union in June 2019, and Australia in January 2023.

It acts as a thrombopoietin receptor agonist.

== Synthesis ==
The chemical synthesis of avatrombopag was recently reported:

skin-invert-image

The halogenation of 2-acetyl-4-chlorothiophene [34730-20-6] (1) gave 2-bromo-1-(4-chloro-2-thienyl)ethanone [677007-73-7] (2). Condensation with thiourea produced 4-(4-chlorothiophen-2-yl)-1,3-thiazol-2-amine [570407-10-2] (3). Halogenation with N-bromosuccinimide (NBS) in DMF have an intermediate which was used for nucleophilic aromatic substitution with 1-cyclohexylpiperazine [17766-28-8] (4) to provide [570407-42-0] (5). Schotten-Baumann reaction with 5,6-dichloronicotinic acid [41667-95-2] (6) gave the corresponding nicotinamide [570403-04-2] (7). A second nucleophilic aromatic substitution ethyl isonipecotate [1126-09-6] (8) gave [570403-14-4] (9). Subsequent saponification completed the synthesis of avatrombopag (10).
