= Eltrombopag =

Chemical compound

Clinical data
- Trade names: Promacta, others
- Other names: SB-497115-GR, Eltrombopag olamine (USAN US)
- AHFS/Drugs.com: Monograph
- MedlinePlus: a609011
- License data: US DailyMed: Eltrombopag olamine
- Pregnancy category: AU: B3
- Routes of administration: By mouth
- ATC code: B02BX05 (WHO)

Legal status
- Legal status: AU: S4 (Prescription only); UK: POM (Prescription only); US: ℞-only; EU: Rx-only

Pharmacokinetic data
- Bioavailability: ~52%
- Protein binding: >99%
- Metabolism: extensive liver (through CYP1A2 and CYP2C8)
- Elimination half-life: 21–35 hours
- Excretion: feces (59%), urine (31%)

Identifiers
- IUPAC name: 3'-{(2Z)-2-[1-(3,4-dimethylphenyl)-3-methyl-5-oxo-1,5-dihydro-4H-pyrazol-4-ylidene]hydrazino}-2'-hydroxy-3-biphenylcarboxylic acid
- CAS Number: 496775-61-2; as olamine: 496775-62-3
- PubChem CID: 9846180; as olamine: 135449331
- DrugBank: DB06210; as olamine: DBSALT000063
- ChemSpider: 21106301; as olamine: 28475107
- UNII: S56D65XJ9G; as olamine: 4U07F515LG
- KEGG: D03978
- ChEBI: CHEBI:85010
- ChEMBL: ChEMBL461101; as olamine: ChEMBL3989691
- CompTox Dashboard (EPA): DTXSID5057753
- ECHA InfoCard: 100.128.125

Chemical and physical data
- Formula: C_{25}H_{22}N_{4}O_{4}
- Molar mass: 442.475 g·mol^{−1}
- 3D model (JSmol): Interactive image
- SMILES: CC1=NN(c2ccc(C)c(C)c2)C(=O)/C1=N\Nc1cccc(-c2cccc(C(=O)O)c2)c1O
- InChI: InChI=1S/C25H22N4O4/c1-14-10-11-19(12-15(14)2)29-24(31)22(16(3)28-29)27-26-21-9-5-8-20(23(21)30)17-6-4-7-18(13-17)25(32)33/h4-13,26,30H,1-3H3,(H,32,33)/b27-22-; Key:XDXWLKQMMKQXPV-QYQHSDTDSA-N

Eltrombopag, sold under the brand name Promacta among others, is a medication used to treat thrombocytopenia (abnormally low platelet counts) and severe aplastic anemia. It is a thrombopoietin receptor agonist. It is taken by mouth.

Eltrombopag was discovered as a result of research collaboration between GlaxoSmithKline and Ligand Pharmaceuticals and is transferred to Novartis Pharmaceuticals.

Eltrombopag was approved for medical use in the US in November 2008, and authorized in the European Union in March 2010.

== Medical uses ==
Eltrombopag is indicated for the treatment of thrombocytopenia in people with persistent or chronic immune thrombocytopenia who have had an insufficient response to corticosteroids, immunoglobulins, or splenectomy; for the treatment of thrombocytopenia in people with chronic hepatitis C to allow the initiation and maintenance of interferon-based therapy; in combination with standard immunosuppressive therapy for the first-line treatment of people with severe aplastic anemia; and for the treatment of people with severe aplastic anemia who have had an insufficient response to immunosuppressive therapy.

== Development ==
In preclinical studies, the compound was shown to interact selectively with the thrombopoietin receptor, leading to activation of the JAK-STAT signaling pathway and increased proliferation and differentiation of megakaryocytes. Animal studies confirmed that it increased platelet counts. In 73 healthy volunteers, higher doses of eltrombopag caused larger increases in the number of circulating platelets without tolerability problems.

== Clinical trials ==
Eltrombopag has been shown to be effective in two major clinical syndromes: idiopathic thrombocytopenic purpura (ITP) and cirrhosis due to hepatitis C (in which low platelet counts may be a contraindication for interferon treatment).

After six weeks of therapy in a phase III trial, eltrombopag 50 mg/day was associated with a significantly higher response rate than placebo in adult patients with chronic idiopathic thrombocytopenic purpura (ITP).

== Society and culture ==
=== Legal status ===
Eltrombopag received breakthrough therapy designation from the US Food and Drug Administration (FDA) in February 2014, for people with aplastic anemia for which immunosuppression has not been successful. In 2017, the NIH made Eltrombopag a standard of care in aplastic anemia.

In October 2024, the Committee for Medicinal Products for Human Use of the European Medicines Agency adopted a positive opinion, recommending the granting of a marketing authorization for the medicinal product Eltrombopag Viatris, intended for the treatment of people with primary immune thrombocytopenia (ITP) and thrombocytopenia associated with chronic hepatitis C. The applicant for this medicinal product is Viatris Limited. Eltrombopag Viatris was authorized in December 2024.

=== Brand names ===
Eltrombopag is sold under the brand name Revolade outside the US and is marketed by Novartis.
