= Romiplostim =

Pharmaceutical drug

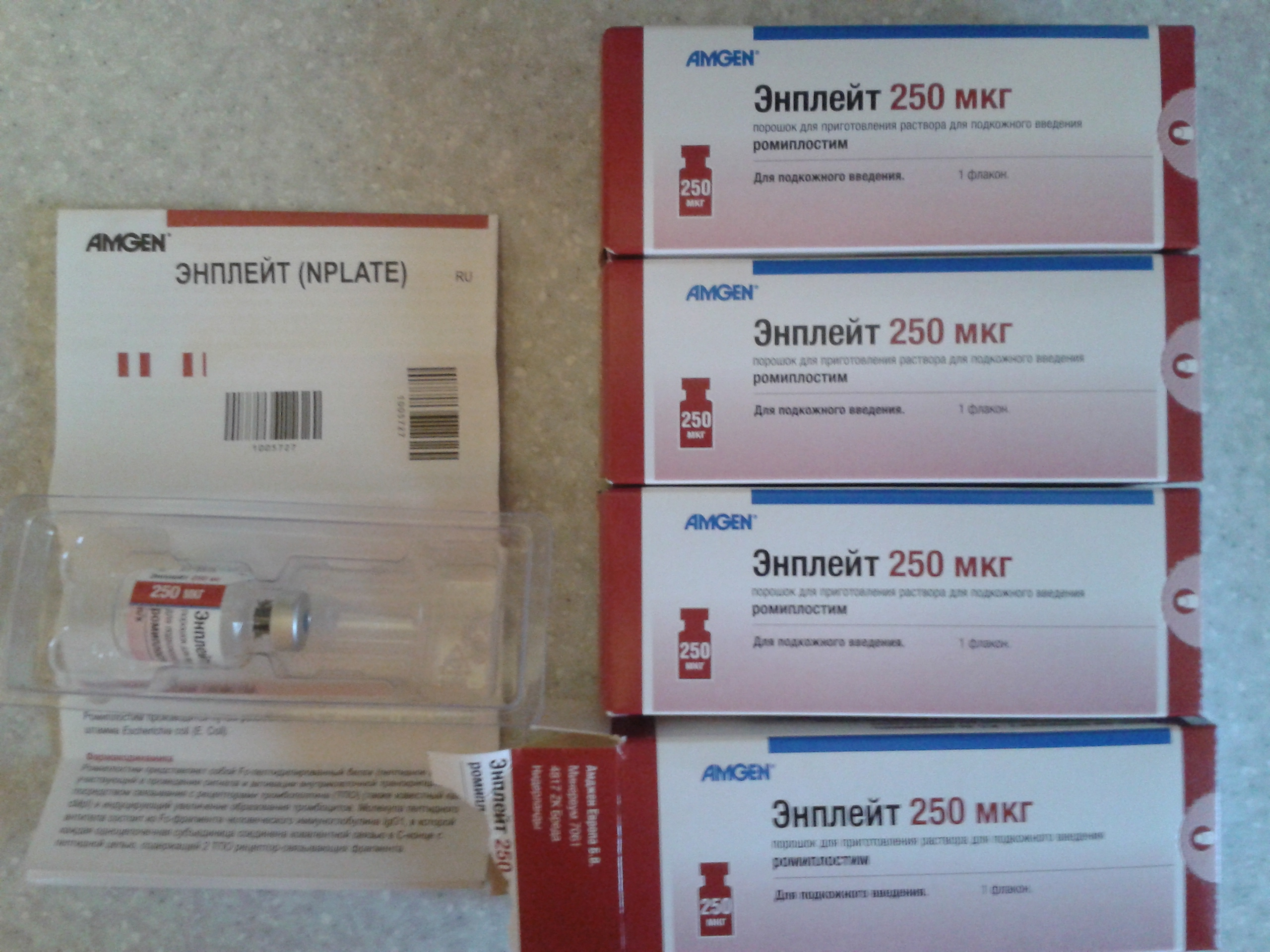

Clinical data
- Trade names: Nplate, others
- Other names: AMG531
- AHFS/Drugs.com: Monograph
- MedlinePlus: a609008
- License data: US DailyMed: Romiplostim
- Pregnancy category: AU: B3
- Routes of administration: Subcutaneous
- ATC code: B02BX04 (WHO)

Legal status
- Legal status: AU: S4 (Prescription only); US: ℞-only; EU: Rx-only

Pharmacokinetic data
- Elimination half-life: 1 to 34 days

Identifiers
- IUPAC name: L-methionyl[human immunoglobulin heavy constant gamma 1-(227 C-terminal residues)-peptide (Fc fragment)] fusion protein with 41 amino acids peptide, (7-7′:10,10′)-bisdisulfide dimer
- CAS Number: 267639-76-9
- IUPHAR/BPS: 6974
- DrugBank: DB05332
- ChemSpider: none
- UNII: GN5XU2DXKV
- KEGG: D08990
- ChEMBL: ChEMBL1201832

Chemical and physical data
- Formula: C_{2634}H_{4086}N_{722}O_{790}S_{18}
- Molar mass: 59085.01 g·mol^{−1}

Romiplostim, sold under the brand name Nplate among others, is a fusion protein analog of thrombopoietin, a hormone that regulates platelet production.

The most common side effects in adults include headache, infections of the nose and throat, and allergic (hypersensitivity) reactions such as rash, itching and rapid swelling under the skin. The most common side effects in children include infections of the nose and throat, runny nose, cough, fever, mouth and throat pain, abdominal (belly) pain, diarrhea, rash, and bruising.

== Medical uses ==
Romiplostim is indicated as a potential treatment for chronic idiopathic (immune) thrombocytopenic purpura (ITP).

== Clinical efficacy ==
In well designed, 24-week, Phase III trials, romiplostim was significantly more effective than placebo in achieving the primary endpoint of a protocol-defined durable platelet response in nonsplenectomized or splenectomized adults with chronic immune thrombocytopenic purpura.

== History ==
Romiplostim was developed by Amgen through a restricted usage program called NEXUS. During development and clinical trials the drug was called AMG531.

Romiplostim was designated an orphan drug by the US Food and Drug Administration (FDA) in 2003

In August 2008, the FDA approved romiplostim as a long-term treatment for chronic immune thrombocytopenia in adults who have not responded to other treatments, such as corticosteroids, intravenous immunoglobulin, Rho(D) immune globulin or splenectomy.

== Society and culture ==
=== Economics ===
The wholesale cost of romiplostim if administered weekly is currently estimated at US$55,250 per year.

== Research ==
Romiplostim may be used to treat acute radiation syndrome. "To reduce radiation-induced bleeding, Nplate stimulates the body’s production of platelets. The drug can be used to treat adults and children."
